= 2012–13 UEFA Futsal Cup =

Tournament details
- Dates: 2012–2013
- Teams: 48 (Total); 16 (Elite Round); 4 (Final Four)

The 2012–13 UEFA Futsal Cup was the 27th edition of Europe's premier club futsal tournament and the 12th edition under the current UEFA Futsal Cup format.

== Teams ==
Elite round
(Spain) FC Barcelona Futsal ^{TH}	(Kazakhstan) AFC Kairat	(Spain) ElPozo Murcia FS	(Portugal) Benfica
Main round
(Italy) Luparense C/5	(Slovakia) Slov-Matic Bratislava	(Cyprus) AC Omonia	(Serbia) KMF Ekonomac Kragujevac
(Latvia) FK Nikars	(Ukraine) SK Energia Lviv	(Czech Republic) Era-Pack Chrudim	(Romania) City'us Târgu Mureş
(Slovenia) FC Litija	(Georgia (country)) Iberia Star	(Greece) Athina 90	(Russia) MFK Dinamo Moskva
(Croatia) MNK Split	(Poland) Akademia FC Pniewy	(Hungary) Győri ETO Futsal Club	(Azerbaijan) Araz Naxçivan
(Netherlands) Club Futsal Eindhoven			
Preliminary round
(Bosnia and Herzegovina) KMF Leotar Trebinje	(Moldova) Lexmax Chişinău	(Malta) FC Balzan Futsal	(Belarus) Lidselmash Lida
(Denmark) København Futsal	(England) Helvécia Futsal Club	(Albania) Edro Vlorë	(Republic of Ireland) EID Futsal
(Austria) Allstars Wiener Neustadt	(Turkey) TUFAD Ankara S.	(Switzerland) Futsal Minerva	(France) Paris Sporting Club
(Germany) Hamburg Panthers	(Belgium) Topsport Antwerpen	(Scotland) Fair City Santos	(Norway) Vegakameratene
(Israel) Maccabi Nahalat Itzhak	(Andorra) FC Encamp	(Armenia) Shahumyan Futsal	(Bulgaria) FC Grand Pro Varna
(Finland) FS Ilves Tampere	(Sweden) Ibra Göteborg	(Wales) Cardiff City FC	(North Macedonia) KMF Železarec Skopje
(Montenegro) KF Jedinstvo Bijelo Polje	(Estonia) FC Anzhi Tallinn	(Lithuania) Bekentas Vilnius	

th Title Holder

== Preliminary round ==
The draw for the preliminary round and the main round took place on 4 July 2012 in the UEFA headquarters in Nyon, Switzerland. First, the 27 lowest ranked teams were divided into 7 groups of 4 (one of 3) and later the tournament hosts were selected, which are indicated in italics. The preliminary round will run from 8 to 12 August, with only the group winners advancing to the next round.

=== Group A ===
Team	Pts	Pld	W	D	L	GF	GA	GD
(Bosnia and Herzegovina) KMF Leotar Trebinje	6	2	2	0	0	13	2	+11
(Moldova) Lexmax Chişinău	3	2	1	0	1	4	4	0
(Malta) FC Balzan Futsal	0	2	0	0	2	1	12	-11

8 August 2012

KMF Leotar Trebinje (Bosnia and Herzegovina)	9–1	(Malta) FC Balzan Futsal

Dvorana Miloš Mrdić, Trebinje

9 August 2012

FC Balzan Futsal (Malta)	0–3	(Moldova) Lexmax Chişinău

Dvorana Miloš Mrdić, Trebinje

10 August 2012

Lexmax Chişinău (Moldova)	1–4	(Bosnia and Herzegovina) KMF Leotar Trebinje

Dvorana Miloš Mrdić, Trebinje

=== Group B ===
Team	Pts	Pld	W	D	L	GF	GA	GD
(Belarus) Lidselmash Lida	9	3	3	0	0	13	4	+9
(Denmark) København Futsal	6	3	2	0	1	14	11	+3
(England) Helvécia Futsal London	3	3	1	0	2	5	10	-5
(Albania) Edro Vlorë	0	3	0	0	3	6	13	-7

8 August 2012

Helvécia Futsal London (England)	2–1	(Albania) Edro Vlorë

Birkerød Iorietscenter, Birkerød

8 August 2012

København Futsal (Denmark)	1–6	(Belarus) Lidselmash Lida

Birkerød Iorietscenter, Birkerød

9 August 2012

Lidselmash Lida (Belarus)	2–1	(England) Helvécia Futsal London

Birkerød Iorietscenter, Birkerød

9 August 2012

København Futsal (Denmark)	6–3	(Albania) Edro Vlorë

Birkerød Iorietscenter, Birkerød

11 August 2012

Edro Vlorë (Albania)	2–5	(Belarus) Lidselmash Lida

Birkerød Iorietscenter, Birkerød

11 August 2012

Helvécia Futsal London (England)	2–7	(Denmark) København Futsal

Birkerød Iorietscenter, Birkerød

=== Group C ===
Team	Pts	Pld	W	D	L	GF	GA	GD
(Republic of Ireland) EID Futsal	6	3	2	0	1	14	13	+1
(Austria) Allstars Wiener Neustadt	4	3	1	1	1	14	12	+2
(Turkey) TUFAD Ankara S.	4	3	1	1	1	11	11	0
(Switzerland) Futsal Minerva	3	3	1	0	2	18	21	-3

8 August 2012

EID Futsal (Republic of Ireland)	3–2	(Turkey) TUFAD Ankara S.

Fred Sinowatz Schule, Wiener Neustadt

8 August 2012

Allstars Wiener Neustadt (Austria)	9–4	(Switzerland) Futsal Minerva

Fred Sinowatz Schule, Wiener Neustadt

9 August 2012

Futsal Minerva (Switzerland)	9–6	(Republic of Ireland) EID Futsal

Fred Sinowatz Schule, Wiener Neustadt

9 August 2012

Allstars Wiener Neustadt (Austria)	3–3	(Turkey) TUFAD Ankara S.

Fred Sinowatz Schule, Wiener Neustadt

11 August 2012

TUFAD Ankara S. (Turkey)	6–5	(Switzerland) Futsal Minerva

Fred Sinowatz Schule, Wiener Neustadt

11 August 2012

EID Futsal (Republic of Ireland)	5–2	(Austria) Allstars Wiener Neustadt

Fred Sinowatz Schule, Wiener Neustadt

=== Group D ===
Team	Pts	Pld	W	D	L	GF	GA	GD
(France) Paris Sporting Club	7	3	2	1	0	28	9	+19
(Germany) Hamburg Panthers	4	3	1	1	1	16	17	-1
(Belgium) Topsport Antwerpen	4	3	1	1	1	28	12	+16
(Scotland) Fair City Santos	1	3	0	1	2	7	41	-34

8 August 2012

Topsport Antwerpen (Belgium)	18–0	(Scotland) Fair City Santos

Halle Carpentier, Paris

8 August 2012

Paris Sporting Club (France)	6–3	(Germany) Hamburg Panthers

Halle Carpentier, Paris

9 August 2012

Hamburg Panthers (Germany)	8–6	(Belgium) Topsport Antwerpen

Halle Carpentier, Paris

9 August 2012

Paris Sporting Club (France)	18–2	(Scotland) Fair City Santos

Halle Carpentier, Paris

11 August 2012

Fair City Santos (Scotland)	5–5	(Germany) Hamburg Panthers

Halle Carpentier, Paris

11 August 2012

Topsport Antwerpen (Belgium)	4–4	(France) Paris Sporting Club

Halle Carpentier, Paris

=== Group E ===
Team	Pts	Pld	W	D	L	GF	GA	GD
(Norway) Vegakameratene	7	3	2	1	0	8	3	+5
(Israel) Maccabi Nahalat Itzhak	5	3	1	2	0	10	7	+3
(Andorra) FC Encamp	3	3	1	0	2	12	13	-1
(Armenia) Shahumyan	1	3	0	1	2	6	13	-7

8 August 2012

Maccabi Nahalat Itzhak (Israel)	3–3	(Armenia) Shahumyan

Poliesportiu d'Andorra, Andorra la Vella

8 August 2012

FC Encamp (Andorra)	2–4	(Norway) Vegakameratene

Poliesportiu d'Andorra, Andorra la Vella

9 August 2012

Vegakameratene (Norway)	0–0	(Israel) Maccabi Nahalat Itzhak

Poliesportiu d'Andorra, Andorra la Vella

9 August 2012

FC Encamp (Andorra)	6–2	(Armenia) Shahumyan

Poliesportiu d'Andorra, Andorra la Vella

11 August 2012

Shahumyan (Armenia)	1–4	(Norway) Vegakameratene

Poliesportiu d'Andorra, Andorra la Vella

11 August 2012

Maccabi Nahalat Itzhak (Israel)	7–4	(Andorra) FC Encamp

Poliesportiu d'Andorra, Andorra la Vella

=== Group F ===
Team	Pts	Pld	W	D	L	GF	GA	GD
(Bulgaria) FC Grand Pro Varna	7	3	2	1	0	11	3	+8
(Finland) FS Ilves Tampere	7	3	2	1	0	8	3	+5
(Sweden) Ibra Göteborg	3	3	1	0	2	13	12	+1
(Wales) Cardiff City FC	0	3	0	0	3	1	15	-14

8 August 2012

FS Ilves Tampere (Finland)	3–0	(Wales) Cardiff City FC

Palace of Culture and Sports, Varna

8 August 2012

FC Grand Pro Varna (Bulgaria)	7–2	(Sweden) Ibra Göteborg

Palace of Culture and Sports, Varna

9 August 2012

Ibra Göteborg (Sweden)	3–5	(Finland) FS Ilves Tampere

Palace of Culture and Sports, Varna

9 August 2012

FC Grand Pro Varna (Bulgaria)	4–1	(Wales) Cardiff City FC

Palace of Culture and Sports, Varna

11 August 2012

Cardiff City FC (Wales)	0–8	(Sweden) Ibra Göteborg

Palace of Culture and Sports, Varna

11 August 2012

FS Ilves Tampere (Finland)	0–0	(Bulgaria) FC Grand Pro Varna

Palace of Culture and Sports, Varna

=== Group G ===
Team	Pts	Pld	W	D	L	GF	GA	GD
(North Macedonia) KMF Železarec Skopje	7	3	2	1	0	10	5	+5
(Montenegro) KF Jedinstvo Bijelo Polje	6	3	2	0	1	16	13	+3
(Estonia) FC Anzhi Tallinn	4	3	1	1	1	11	11	0
(Lithuania) Bekentas Vilnius	0	3	0	0	3	5	13	-8

9 August 2012

KF Jedinstvo Bijelo Polje (Montenegro)	7–6	(Estonia) FC Anzhi Tallinn

Sport Recreation Center Kale-Skopje, Skopje

9 August 2012

KMF Železarec Skopje (North Macedonia)	3–1	(Lithuania) Bekentas Vilnius

Sport Recreation Center Kale-Skopje, Skopje

10 August 2012

Bekentas Vilnius (Lithuania)	2–7	(Montenegro) KF Jedinstvo Bijelo Polje

Sport Recreation Center Kale-Skopje, Skopje

10 August 2012

KMF Železarec Skopje (North Macedonia)	2–2	(Estonia) FC Anzhi Tallinn

Sport Recreation Center Kale-Skopje, Skopje

12 August 2012

FC Anzhi Tallinn (Estonia)	3–2	(Lithuania) Bekentas Vilnius

Sport Recreation Center Kale-Skopje, Skopje

12 August 2012

KF Jedinstvo Bijelo Polje (Montenegro)	2–5	(North Macedonia) KMF Železarec Skopje

Sport Recreation Center Kale-Skopje, Skopje

== Main round ==
Following the preliminary round draw, the seventeen teams allocated in the main round pot and the seven group winners were distributed into six groups of four. Matches are set to take place between 4 September and 8 October, hosted by a selected club in each group, which is highlighted with italics. The top two teams in each group will join the four highest-ranked clubs, that are already in the elite round after received bye for the early stage of the tournament.

=== Group 1 ===
Team	Pts	Pld	W	D	L	GF	GA	GD
(Italy) Luparense C/5	7	3	2	1	0	7	1	+6
(Slovakia) Slov-Matic Bratislava	5	3	1	2	0	10	5	+5
(Cyprus) Omonia	4	3	1	1	1	9	11	-2
(Bulgaria) FC Grand Pro Varna	0	3	0	0	3	5	14	-9

6 September 2012

Omonia (Cyprus)	3–3	(Slovakia) Slov-Matic Bratislava

Tassos Papadopoulos, Nicosia

6 September 2012

Luparense C/5 (Italy)	2–0	(Bulgaria) FC Grand Pro Varna

Tassos Papadopoulos, Nicosia

7 September 2012

Omonia (Cyprus)	5–3	(Bulgaria) FC Grand Pro Varna

Tassos Papadopoulos, Nicosia

7 September 2012

Slov-Matic Bratislava (Slovakia)	0–0	(Italy) Luparense C/5

Tassos Papadopoulos, Nicosia

9 September 2012

FC Grand Pro Varna (Bulgaria)	2–7	(Slovakia) Slov-Matic Bratislava

Tassos Papadopoulos, Nicosia

9 September 2012

Luparense C/5 (Italy)	5–1	(Cyprus) Omonia

Tassos Papadopoulos, Nicosia

=== Group 2 ===
Team	Pts	Pld	W	D	L	GF	GA	GD
(Serbia) Ekonomac Kragujevac	9	3	3	0	0	18	6	+12
(Latvia) FK Nikars	6	3	2	0	1	11	6	+5
(Norway) Vegakameratene	3	3	1	0	2	7	10	-3
(North Macedonia) KMF Železarec Skopje	0	3	0	0	3	4	18	-14

5 September 2012

Ekonomac Kragujevac (Serbia)	6–2	(Norway) Vegakameratene
	Report

Olimpiskais Sporta Centrs, Riga
Attendance: 95

5 September 2012

FK Nikars (Latvia)	6–1	(North Macedonia) KMF Železarec Skopje
	Report

Olimpiskais Sporta Centrs, Riga
Attendance: 400

6 September 2012

KMF Železarec Skopje (North Macedonia)	1–8	(Serbia) Ekonomac Kragujevac
	Report

Olimpiskais Sporta Centrs, Riga
Attendance: 70

6 September 2012

FK Nikars (Latvia)	2–1	(Norway) Vegakameratene
	Report

Olimpiskais Sporta Centrs, Riga
Attendance: 320

8 September 2012

Vegakameratene (Norway)	4–2	(North Macedonia) KMF Železarec Skopje
	Report

Olimpiskais Sporta Centrs, Riga
Attendance: 90

8 September 2012

Ekonomac Kragujevac (Serbia)	4–3	(Latvia) FK Nikars
	Report

Olimpiskais Sporta Centrs, Riga
Attendance: 360

=== Group 3 ===
Team	Pts	Pld	W	D	L	GF	GA	GD
(Ukraine) SK Energia Lviv	6	3	2	0	1	14	8	+6
(Czech Republic) Era-Pack Chrudim	6	3	2	0	1	11	7	+4
(Romania) City'us Târgu Mureş	6	3	2	0	1	11	11	0
(Bosnia and Herzegovina) KMF Leotar Trebinje	0	3	0	0	3	3	13	-10

4 September 2012

City'us Târgu Mureş (Romania)	3–1	(Bosnia and Herzegovina) KMF Leotar Trebinje

Zimní Stadión, Chrudim

4 September 2012

Era-Pack Chrudim (Czech Republic)	3–2	(Ukraine) SK Energia Lviv

Zimní Stadión, Chrudim

5 September 2012

SK Energia Lviv (Ukraine)	6–3	(Romania) City'us Târgu Mureş

Zimní Stadión, Chrudim

5 September 2012

Era-Pack Chrudim (Czech Republic)	4–0	(Bosnia and Herzegovina) KMF Leotar Trebinje

Zimní Stadión, Chrudim

7 September 2012

KMF Leotar Trebinje (Bosnia and Herzegovina)	2–6	(Ukraine) SK Energia Lviv

Zimní Stadión, Chrudim

7 September 2012

City'us Târgu Mureş (Romania)	5–4	(Czech Republic) Era-Pack Chrudim

Zimní Stadión, Chrudim

=== Group 4 ===
Team	Pts	Pld	W	D	L	GF	GA	GD
(Slovenia) FC Litija	7	3	2	1	0	12	6	+6
(Georgia (country)) Iberia Star	6	3	2	0	1	7	5	+2
(France) Paris Sporting Club	4	3	1	1	1	12	7	+5
(Greece) Athina 90	0	3	0	0	3	4	17	-13

5 September 2012

Iberia Star (Georgia (country))	3–2	(France) Paris Sporting Club

Sportna Dvorana Litija, Litija

5 September 2012

FC Litija (Slovenia)	7–2	(Greece) Athina 90

Sportna Dvorana Litija, Litija

6 September 2012

Athina 90 (Greece)	1–3	(Georgia (country)) Iberia Star

Sportna Dvorana Litija, Litija

6 September 2012

FC Litija (Slovenia)	3–3	(France) Paris Sporting Club

Sportna Dvorana Litija, Litija

8 September 2012

Paris Sporting Club (France)	7–1	(Greece) Athina 90

Sportna Dvorana Litija, Litija

8 September 2012

Iberia Star (Georgia (country))	1–2	(Slovenia) FC Litija

Sportna Dvorana Litija, Litija

=== Group 5 ===
Team	Pts	Pld	W	D	L	GF	GA	GD
(Russia) MFK Dinamo Moskva	9	3	3	0	0	21	2	+19
(Croatia) MNK Split	6	3	2	0	1	7	11	-4
(Belarus) Lidselmash Lida	3	3	1	0	2	6	6	0
(Poland) Akademia FC Pniewy	0	3	0	0	3	0	15	-15

5 September 2012

MNK Split (Croatia)	5–0 Match forfeited	(Poland) Akademia FC Pniewy

Sports Centre Gripe, Split

5 September 2012

MNK Split (Croatia)	1–0	(Belarus) Lidselmash Lida

Sports Centre Gripe, Split

6 September 2012

Akademia FC Pniewy (Poland)	0–5 Match forfeited	(Russia) MFK Dinamo Moskva

Sports Centre Gripe, Split

6 September 2012

Lidselmash Lida (Belarus)	1–5	(Russia) MFK Dinamo Moskva

Sports Centre Gripe, Split

8 September 2012

Lidselmash Lida (Belarus)	5–0 Match forfeited	(Poland) Akademia FC Pniewy

Sports Centre Gripe, Split

8 September 2012

MNK Split (Croatia)	1–11	(Russia) MFK Dinamo Moskva

Sports Centre Gripe, Split

=== Group 6 ===
Team	Pts	Pld	W	D	L	GF	GA	GD
(Hungary) Győri ETO Futsal Club	7	3	2	1	0	14	7	+7
(Azerbaijan) Araz Naxçivan	4	3	1	1	1	9	13	-4
(Netherlands) Club Futsal Eindhoven	3	3	1	0	2	9	10	-1
(Republic of Ireland) EID Futsal	3	3	1	0	2	10	12	-2

5 September 2012

Araz Naxçivan (Azerbaijan)	0–5 Match forfeited	(Republic of Ireland) EID Futsal

Magvassy Mihály Sportcsarnok, Győr

5 September 2012

Győri ETO Futsal Club (Hungary)	3–0	(Netherlands) Club Futsal Eindhoven

Magvassy Mihály Sportcsarnok, Győr

6 September 2012

Club Futsal Eindhoven (Netherlands)	3–4	(Azerbaijan) Araz Naxçivan

Magvassy Mihály Sportcsarnok, Győr

6 September 2012

Győri ETO Futsal Club (Hungary)	6–2	(Republic of Ireland) EID Futsal

Magvassy Mihály Sportcsarnok, Győr

8 September 2012

EID Futsal (Republic of Ireland)	3–6	(Netherlands) Club Futsal Eindhoven

Magvassy Mihály Sportcsarnok, Győr

8 September 2012

Araz Naxçivan (Azerbaijan)	5–5	(Hungary) Győri ETO Futsal Club

Magvassy Mihály Sportcsarnok, Győr

== Elite round ==
=== Group A ===
Team	Pts	Pld	W	D	L	GF	GA	GD
(Spain) FC Barcelona Futsal	9	3	3	0	0	28	1	+27
(Slovenia) FC Litija	6	3	2	0	1	15	7	+8
(Azerbaijan) Araz Naxçivan	3	3	1	0	2	9	13	-4
(Croatia) MNK Split	0	3	0	0	3	2	33	-31

10 October 2012

FC Barcelona Futsal (Spain)	18–0	(Croatia) MNK Split

Tri Lilije Hall, Laško

10 October 2012

FC Litija (Slovenia)	5–3	(Azerbaijan) Araz Naxçivan

Tri Lilije Hall, Laško

11 October 2012

Araz Naxçivan (Azerbaijan)	1–7	(Spain) FC Barcelona Futsal

Tri Lilije Hall, Laško

11 October 2012

FC Litija (Slovenia)	10–1	(Croatia) MNK Split

Tri Lilije Hall, Laško

13 October 2012

MNK Split (Croatia)	1–5	(Azerbaijan) Araz Naxçivan

Tri Lilije Hall, Laško

13 October 2012

FC Barcelona Futsal (Spain)	3–0	(Slovenia) FC Litija

Tri Lilije Hall, Laško

=== Group B ===
Team	Pts	Pld	W	D	L	GF	GA	GD
(Kazakhstan) AFC Kairat	9	3	3	0	0	16	6	+10
(Serbia) Ekonomac Kragujevac	4	3	1	1	1	7	9	-2
(Czech Republic) Era-Pack Chrudim	3	3	1	0	2	10	11	-1
(Slovakia) Slov-Matic Bratislava	1	3	0	1	2	5	12	-7

10 October 2012

Ekonomac Kragujevac (Serbia)	4–1	(Czech Republic) Era-Pack Chrudim

Hala Jezero, Kragujevac

10 October 2012

AFC Kairat (Kazakhstan)	5–1	(Slovakia) Slov-Matic Bratislava

Hala Jezero, Kragujevac

11 October 2012

Ekonomac Kragujevac (Serbia)	3–3	(Slovakia) Slov-Matic Bratislava

Hala Jezero, Kragujevac

11 October 2012

Era-Pack Chrudim (Czech Republic)	5–6	(Kazakhstan) AFC Kairat

Hala Jezero, Kragujevac

13 October 2012

Slov-Matic Bratislava (Slovakia)	1–4	(Czech Republic) Era-Pack Chrudim

Hala Jezero, Kragujevac

13 October 2012

AFC Kairat (Kazakhstan)	5–0	(Serbia) Ekonomac Kragujevac

Hala Jezero, Kragujevac

=== Group C ===
Team	Pts	Pld	W	D	L	GF	GA	GD
(Russia) MFK Dinamo Moskva	9	3	3	0	0	16	4	+12
(Spain) ElPozo Murcia FS	6	3	2	0	1	16	8	+8
(Ukraine) SK Energia Lviv	3	3	1	0	2	6	14	-8
(Latvia) FK Nikars	0	3	0	0	3	4	16	-12

10 October 2012

MFK Dinamo Moskva (Russia)	7–2	(Latvia) FK Nikars
	Report

Palacio de Deportes de Murcia, Murcia
Attendance: 200

10 October 2012

ElPozo Murcia FS (Spain)	8–3	(Ukraine) SK Energia Lviv
	Report

Palacio de Deportes de Murcia, Murcia
Attendance: 2000

11 October 2012

SK Energia Lviv (Ukraine)	0–5	(Russia) MFK Dinamo Moskva
	Report

Palacio de Deportes de Murcia, Murcia
Attendance: 200

11 October 2012

ElPozo Murcia FS (Spain)	6–1	(Latvia) FK Nikars
	Report

Palacio de Deportes de Murcia, Murcia
Attendance: 2000

13 October 2012

FK Nikars (Latvia)	1–3	(Ukraine) SK Energia Lviv
	Report

Palacio de Deportes de Murcia, Murcia
Attendance: 300

13 October 2012

MFK Dinamo Moskva (Russia)	4–2	(Spain) ElPozo Murcia FS
	Report

Palacio de Deportes de Murcia, Murcia
Attendance: 5000

=== Group D ===
Team	Pts	Pld	W	D	L	GF	GA	GD
(Georgia (country)) Iberia Star	7	3	2	1	0	15	7	+8
(Hungary) Győri ETO Futsal Club	5	3	1	2	0	8	7	+1
(Portugal) Benfica	4	3	1	1	1	10	12	-2
(Italy) Luparense C/5	0	3	0	0	3	5	12	-7

11 October 2012

Benfica (Portugal)	3–3	(Hungary) Győri ETO Futsal Club

Sportis Sasakhle, Tbilisi

11 October 2012

Iberia Star (Georgia (country))	6–1	(Italy) Luparense C/5

Sportis Sasakhle, Tbilisi

12 October 2012

Luparense C/5 (Italy)	2–3	(Portugal) Benfica

Sportis Sasakhle, Tbilisi

12 October 2012

Iberia Star (Georgia (country))	2–2	(Hungary) Győri ETO Futsal Club

Sportis Sasakhle, Tbilisi

14 October 2012

Győri ETO Futsal Club (Hungary)	3–2	(Italy) Luparense C/5

Sportis Sasakhle, Tbilisi

14 October 2012

Benfica (Portugal)	4–7	(Georgia (country)) Iberia Star

Sportis Sasakhle, Tbilisi

== Final four ==
The following teams have qualified for the Final Four round:

- (Spain) FC Barcelona Futsal
- (Kazakhstan) AFC Kairat
- (Russia) MFK Dinamo Moskva
- (Georgia (country)) Iberia Star (host)

Semi-finals
26 April–Sports Palace Tbilisi
(Georgia (country)) Iberia Star	2
(Russia) MFK Dinamo Moskva	5
26 April–Sports Palace Tbilisi
(Spain) FC Barcelona Alusport	4
(Kazakhstan) AFC Kairat	5

Final
28 April–Sports Palace Tbilisi
(Russia) MFK Dinamo Moskva	3
(Kazakhstan) AFC Kairat	4
Third place
28 April–Sports Palace Tbilisi
(Georgia (country)) Iberia Star	1
(Spain) FC Barcelona Alusport	4

=== Final ===
28 April 2013	MFK Dinamo Moskva	3 – 4	AFC Kairat	Sportis Sasakhle, Tbilisi
20:30 UTC+4	Sergeyev 19'; Cirilo 36'; Tatú 37'	Report	Popov 11' (o.g.); Leo Santana 23'; Fumasa 29'; Higuita 33'	Attendance: 5120; Referee: Francesco Massini (ITA); Second referee: Eduardo Fernandes Coelho (POR)

UEFA Futsal Cup
2012–13 Winners

AFC Kairat
1st Title
