= 2011–12 UEFA Futsal Cup =

Tournament details
- Dates: 2011–2012
- Teams: 49 (Total); 16 (Elite Round); 4 (Final Four)
- Venue: Pavelló Barris Nord (in Lleida host cities)

Final positions
- Champions: Barcelona
- Runners-up: Dinamo Moskva

Tournament statistics
- Matches played: 4
- Goals scored: 19 (4.75 per match)
- Top scorer(s): Wilde, 3
- Best player: Wilde

The 2011–12 UEFA Futsal Cup was the 26th edition of Europe's premier club futsal tournament and the 11th edition under the current UEFA Futsal Cup format.

== Teams ==
Elite round
(Italy) Montesilvano ^{TH}	(Portugal) Sporting CP	(Kazakhstan) Kairat Almaty	(Azerbaijan) Araz Naxçivan
Main round
(Russia) MFK Dinamo Moskva	(Spain) Barcelona	(Czech Republic) Era-Pack Chrudim	(Italy) Marca Futsal
(Slovakia) Slov-Matic Bratislava	(Greece) Athina '90	(Ukraine) Uragan Ivano-Frankovsk	(Croatia) MNK Split
(Belgium) Châtelineau	(Belarus) Mapid Minsk	(Israel) ASA Ben Gurion	(Georgia (country)) Iberia Star
(Serbia) KMF Ekonomac Kragujevac	(Latvia) Nikars Riga	(Romania) City'US Târgu Mureş	(Poland) Akademia Pniewy
(Slovenia) FC Litija			
Preliminary round
(Netherlands) CFE/VDL Groep	(Lithuania) Nautara Kaunas	(Hungary) Győri ETO	(Finland) Ilves Tampere
(Moldova) Tornado Chişinău	(Denmark) BGA Futsal	(England) Helvécia	(Republic of Ireland) EID Futsal
(Montenegro) KMF Bajo Pivljanin	(Armenia) Erebuni Futsal	(Germany) Croatia Berlin	(France) Sporting Paris
(Sweden) Falcão Stockholm	(Malta) Excess RP Bidnija	(Norway) Vegakameratene	(Estonia) Anzhi Tallinn
(Iceland) Fjölnir	(Turkey) Istanbul Üniversitesi	(Albania) Flamurtari	(Andorra) FC Encamp
(Wales) The New Saints	(Cyprus) AC Omonia Nicosia	(Bulgaria) MFC Varna	(North Macedonia) KMF Železarec Skopje
(Bosnia and Herzegovina) KMF Leotar Trebinje	(Austria) Stella Rossa	(Switzerland) Geneva Futsal	(Scotland) Perth Saltires

th Title Holder

== Preliminary round ==
The draw for the preliminary round and the main round took place on 6 July 2011 in the UEFA headquarters in Nyon, Switzerland. First, the twenty-eight lowest ranked teams were divided into seven groups of four and later the tournament hosts were selected, which are indicated in italics. The preliminary round will run from 13 to 21 August, with only the group winners advancing to the next round.

=== Group A ===
Team	Pts	Pld	W	D	L	GF	GA
(Finland) Ilves Tampere	7	3	2	1	0	15	9
(Montenegro) KMF Bajo Pivljanin	6	3	2	0	1	17	10
(Germany) Croatia Berlin	3	3	1	0	2	13	18
(Scotland) Perth Saltires	1	3	0	1	2	4	12

15 August 2011

(Finland) Ilves	8–4	(Germany) Croatia Berlin

Bell's Sports Centre, Perth (SCO)

15 August 2011

(Scotland) Perth Saltires	0–6	(Montenegro) Bajo Pivljanin

Bell's Sports Centre, Perth (SCO)

16 August 2011

(Montenegro) Bajo Pivljanin	2–4	(Finland) Ilves

Bell's Sports Centre, Perth (SCO)

16 August 2011

(Scotland) Perth Saltires	1–3	(Germany) Croatia Berlin

Bell's Sports Centre, Perth (SCO)

18 August 2011

(Germany) Croatia Berlin	6–9	(Montenegro) Bajo Pivljanin

Bell's Sports Centre, Perth (SCO)

18 August 2011

(Finland) Ilves	3–3	(Scotland) Perth Saltires

Bell's Sports Centre, Perth (SCO)

=== Group B ===
Team	Pts	Pld	W	D	L	GF	GA
(Switzerland) Geneva Futsal	7	3	2	1	0	23	6
(Republic of Ireland) EID Futsal	7	3	2	1	0	19	14
(Lithuania) Nautara Kaunas	3	3	1	0	2	15	13
(Wales) The New Saints	0	3	0	0	3	11	35

16 August 2011

(Lithuania) Nautara Kaunas	9–3	(Wales) TNS

Henry Dunant, Geneva (SUI)

16 August 2011

(Switzerland) Geneva	3–3	(Republic of Ireland) EID

Henry Dunant, Geneva (SUI)

16 August 2011

(Republic of Ireland) EID	5–4	(Lithuania) Nautara Kaunas

Henry Dunant, Geneva (SUI)

16 August 2011

(Switzerland) Geneva	15–1	(Wales) TNS

Henry Dunant, Geneva (SUI)

16 August 2011

(Wales) TNS	7–11	(Republic of Ireland) EID

Henry Dunant, Geneva (SUI)

16 August 2011

(Lithuania) Nautara Kaunas	2–5	(Switzerland) Geneva

Henry Dunant, Geneva (SUI)

=== Group C ===
Team	Pts	Pld	W	D	L	GF	GA
(Bosnia and Herzegovina) KMF Leotar Trebinje	9	3	3	0	0	24	7
(Moldova) Tornado Chişinău	6	3	2	0	1	11	10
(Andorra) FC Encamp	3	3	1	0	2	15	21
(Sweden) Falcão Stockholm	0	3	0	0	3	8	20

15 August 2011

(Moldova) Tornado	6–3	(Andorra) Encamp

Miloš Mrdić, Trebinje (BIH)

15 August 2011

(Bosnia and Herzegovina) Leotar	10–0	(Sweden) Falcao Stockholm

Miloš Mrdić, Trebinje (BIH)

16 August 2011

(Sweden) Falcao Stockholm	1–2	(Moldova) Tornado

Miloš Mrdić, Trebinje (BIH)

16 August 2011

(Bosnia and Herzegovina) Leotar	8–4	(Andorra) Encamp

Miloš Mrdić, Trebinje (BIH)

18 August 2011

(Andorra) Encamp	8–7	(Sweden) Falcao Stockholm

Miloš Mrdić, Trebinje (BIH)

18 August 2011

(Moldova) Tornado	3–6	(Bosnia and Herzegovina) Leotar

Miloš Mrdić, Trebinje (BIH)

=== Group D ===
Team	Pts	Pld	W	D	L	GF	GA
(Norway) Vegakameratene	9	3	3	0	0	12	6
(Bulgaria) MFC Varna	6	3	2	0	1	16	13
(Denmark) BGA Futsal	3	3	1	0	2	10	11
(Iceland) Fjölnir	0	3	0	0	3	9	17

13 August 2011

(Denmark) BGA	5–3	(Iceland) Fjölnir

Palace of Culture and Sports, Varna (BUL)

13 August 2011

(Bulgaria) Varna	3–5	(Norway) Vegakameratene

Palace of Culture and Sports, Varna (BUL)

14 August 2011

(Norway) Vegakameratene	3–2	(Denmark) BGA

Palace of Culture and Sports, Varna (BUL)

14 August 2011

(Bulgaria) Varna	8–5	(Iceland) Fjölnir

Palace of Culture and Sports, Varna (BUL)

16 August 2011

(Iceland) Fjölnir	1–4	(Norway) Vegakameratene

Palace of Culture and Sports, Varna (BUL)

16 August 2011

(Denmark) BGA	3–5	(Bulgaria) Varna

Palace of Culture and Sports, Varna (BUL)

=== Group E ===
Team	Pts	Pld	W	D	L	GF	GA
(Hungary) Győri ETO	9	3	3	0	0	25	4
(England) Helvécia Futsal	6	3	2	0	1	13	9
(Austria) Stella Rossa	3	3	1	0	2	14	19
(Estonia) Anzhi Tallinn	0	3	0	0	3	2	22

14 August 2011

(Hungary) Győr	9–0	(Estonia) Anzhi Tallinn

Hollgasse Hall, Vienna (AUT)

14 August 2011

(Austria) Stella Rossa	3–7	(England) Helvécia

Hollgasse Hall, Vienna (AUT)

15 August 2011

(England) Helvécia	1–6	(Hungary) Győr

Hollgasse Hall, Vienna (AUT)

15 August 2011

(Austria) Stella Rossa	8–2	(Estonia) Anzhi Tallinn

Hollgasse Hall, Vienna (AUT)

17 August 2011

(Estonia) Anzhi Tallinn	0–5	(England) Helvécia

Hollgasse Hall, Vienna (AUT)

17 August 2011

(Hungary) Győr	10–3	(Austria) Stella Rossa

Hollgasse Hall, Vienna (AUT)

=== Group F ===
Team	Pts	Pld	W	D	L	GF	GA
(Netherlands) CFE/VDL Groep	9	3	3	0	0	22	9
(North Macedonia) KMF Železarec Skopje	6	3	2	0	1	28	11
(Turkey) Istanbul Üniversitesi	3	3	1	0	2	17	28
(Malta) Excess RP Bidnija	0	3	0	0	3	9	28

18 August 2011

(Netherlands) Eindhoven	7–3	(Turkey) Istanbul

Sport Recreation Center Kale-Skopje, Skopje (MKD)

18 August 2011

(North Macedonia) Železarec	9–1	(Malta) Excess Bidnija

Sport Recreation Center Kale-Skopje, Skopje (MKD)

19 August 2011

(Malta) Excess Bidnija	2–8	(Netherlands) Eindhoven

Sport Recreation Center Kale-Skopje, Skopje (MKD)

19 August 2011

(North Macedonia) Železarec	15–3	(Turkey) Istanbul

Sport Recreation Center Kale-Skopje, Skopje (MKD)

21 August 2011

(Turkey) Istanbul	11–6	(Malta) Excess Bidnija

Sport Recreation Center Kale-Skopje, Skopje (MKD)

21 August 2011

(Netherlands) Eindhoven	7–4	(North Macedonia) Železarec

Sport Recreation Center Kale-Skopje, Skopje (MKD)

=== Group G ===
Team	Pts	Pld	W	D	L	GF	GA
(Cyprus) Omonia	9	3	3	0	0	19	6
(France) Sporting Paris	6	3	2	0	1	19	11
(Armenia) Erebuni Futsal	3	3	1	0	2	8	14
(Albania) KS Flamurtari	0	3	0	0	3	5	20

13 August 2011

(Armenia) Erebuni	5 – 0 Match forfeited	(Albania) Flamurtari

Tassos Papadopoulos, Nicosia (CYP)

13 August 2011

(Cyprus) Omonia	5–4	(France) Paris SC

Tassos Papadopoulos, Nicosia (CYP)

14 August 2011

(France) Paris SC	6–1	(Armenia) Erebuni

Tassos Papadopoulos, Nicosia (CYP)

14 August 2011

(Cyprus) Omonia	6–0	(Albania) Flamurtari

Tassos Papadopoulos, Nicosia (CYP)

16 August 2011

(Albania) Flamurtari	5–9	(France) Paris SC

Tassos Papadopoulos, Nicosia (CYP)

16 August 2011

(Armenia) Erebuni	2–8	(Cyprus) Omonia

Tassos Papadopoulos, Nicosia (CYP)

== Main round ==
Following the preliminary round draw, the seventeen teams allocated in the main round pot and the seven group winners were distributed into six groups of four. Matches are set to take place between 24 September and 2 October, hosted by a selected club in each group, which is highlighted with italics. The top two teams in each group will join the four highest-ranked clubs, that are already in the elite round after received bye for the early stage of the tournament.

=== Group A ===
Team	Pts	Pld	W	D	L	GF	GA
(Netherlands) CFE/VDL Groep	6	3	2	0	1	17	8
(Russia) MFK Dinamo Moskva	6	3	2	0	1	13	7
(Slovenia) FC Litija	4	3	1	1	1	9	9
(Greece) Athina 90	1	3	0	1	2	7	22

29 September 2011

Dinamo Moskva (Russia)	0 – 5 Match forfeited	(Netherlands) CFE/VDL Groep
	Report

Sportna Dvorana Litija, Litija (SVN)

29 September 2011

FC Litija (Slovenia)	3–3	(Greece) Athina 90
	Report

Sportna Dvorana Litija, Litija (SVN)

30 September 2011

Athina 90 (Greece)	1–9	(Russia) Dinamo Moskva
	Report

Sportna Dvorana Litija, Litija (SVN)

30 September 2011

FC Litija (Slovenia)	5–2	(Netherlands) CFE/VDL Groep
	Report

Sportna Dvorana Litija, Litija (SVN)

2 October 2011

CFE/VDL Groep (Netherlands)	10–3	(Greece) Athina 90
	Report

Sportna Dvorana Litija, Litija (SVN)

2 October 2011

Dinamo Moskva (Russia)	4–1	(Slovenia) FC Litija
	Report

Sportna Dvorana Litija, Litija (SVN)

=== Group B ===
Team	Pts	Pld	W	D	L	GF	GA
(Spain) Barcelona	9	3	3	0	0	29	2
(Hungary) Győri ETO	6	3	2	0	1	16	17
(Bosnia and Herzegovina) KMF Leotar Trebinje	1	3	0	1	2	8	19
(Latvia) Nikars Riga	1	3	0	1	2	7	22

29 September 2011

Barcelona (Spain)	9–0	(Bosnia and Herzegovina) Leotar Trebinje
	Report

Zemgales Olympic Centre, Jelgava (LVA)
Attendance: 350

29 September 2011

FK Nikars (Latvia)	4–7	(Hungary) Győri ETO
	Report

Zemgales Olympic Centre, Jelgava (LVA)
Attendance: 600

30 September 2011

Győri ETO (Hungary)	2–8	(Spain) Barcelona
	Report

Zemgales Olympic Centre, Jelgava (LVA)
Attendance: 250

30 September 2011

FK Nikars (Latvia)	3–3	(Bosnia and Herzegovina) Leotar Trebinje
	Report

Zemgales Olympic Centre, Jelgava (LVA)
Attendance: 500

2 October 2011

Leotar Trebinje (Bosnia and Herzegovina)	5–7	(Hungary) Győri ETO
	Report

Zemgales Olympic Centre, Jelgava (LVA)
Attendance: 300

2 October 2011

Barcelona (Spain)	12–0	(Latvia) FK Nikars
	Report

Zemgales Olympic Centre, Jelgava (LVA)
Attendance: 1000

=== Group C ===
Team	Pts	Pld	W	D	L	GF	GA
(Georgia (country)) Iberia Star Tbilisi	7	3	2	1	0	18	3
(Slovakia) Slov-Matic Bratislava	5	3	1	2	0	10	9
(Belarus) Mapid Minsk	3	3	1	0	2	5	6
(Switzerland) Geneva Futsal	1	3	0	1	2	5	20

27 September 2011

Slov-Matic Bratislava (Slovakia)	5–5	(Switzerland) Geneva Futsal
	Report

Sportis Sasakhle, Tbilisi (GEO)

27 September 2011

Iberia Star Tbilisi (Georgia (country))	4–0	(Belarus) Mapid Minsk
	Report

Sportis Sasakhle, Tbilisi (GEO)

28 September 2011

Mapid Minsk (Belarus)	1–2	(Slovakia) Slov-Matic Bratislava
	Report

Sportis Sasakhle, Tbilisi (GEO)

28 September 2011

Iberia Star Tbilisi (Georgia (country))	11–0	(Switzerland) Geneva Futsal
	Report

Sportis Sasakhle, Tbilisi (GEO)

30 September 2011

Geneva Futsal (Switzerland)	0–4	(Belarus) Mapid Minsk
	Report

Sportis Sasakhle, Tbilisi (GEO)

30 September 2011

Slov-Matic Bratislava (Slovakia)	3–3	(Georgia (country)) Iberia Star Tbilisi
	Report

Sportis Sasakhle, Tbilisi (GEO)

=== Group D ===
Team	Pts	Pld	W	D	L	GF	GA
(Belgium) A&M Châtelineau	7	3	2	1	0	9	6
(Czech Republic) Era-Pack Chrudim	6	3	2	0	1	13	8
(Poland) Akademia Pniewy	3	3	1	0	2	7	10
(Norway) Vegakameratene	1	3	0	1	2	6	11

24 September 2011

Era-Pack Chrudim (Czech Republic)	6–2	(Norway) Vegakameratene
	Report

Arena Poznan, Poznań (POL)

24 September 2011

Akademia Pniewy (Poland)	2–3	(Belgium) A&M Châtelineau
	Report

Arena Poznan, Poznań (POL)

25 September 2011

A&M Châtelineau (Belgium)	4–2	(Czech Republic) Era-Pack Chrudim
	Report

Arena Poznan, Poznań (POL)

25 September 2011

Akademia Pniewy (Poland)	3–2	(Norway) Vegakameratene
	Report

Arena Poznan, Poznań (POL)

27 September 2011

Vegakameratene (Norway)	2–2	(Belgium) A&M Châtelineau
	Report

Arena Poznan, Poznań (POL)

27 September 2011

Era-Pack Chrudim (Czech Republic)	5–2	(Poland) Akademia Pniewy
	Report

Arena Poznan, Poznań (POL)

=== Group E ===
Team	Pts	Pld	W	D	L	GF	GA
(Italy) Marca Futsal	9	3	3	0	0	15	3
(Romania) City'US Târgu Mureş	6	3	2	0	1	13	7
(Croatia) MNK Split	3	3	1	0	2	6	10
(Finland) Ilves Tampere	0	3	0	0	3	3	17

27 September 2011

Marca Futsal (Italy)	6–0	(Finland) Ilves FS
	Report

CS CITY'US Tirgu-Mures, Târgu Mureș (ROU)

27 September 2011

City'US Târgu Mureş (Romania)	4–1	(Croatia) MNK Split
	Report

CS CITY'US Tirgu-Mures, Târgu Mureș (ROU)

28 September 2011

MNK Split (Croatia)	1–4	(Italy) Marca Futsal
	Report

CS CITY'US Tirgu-Mures, Târgu Mureș (ROU)

28 September 2011

City'US Târgu Mureş (Romania)	7–1	(Finland) Ilves FS
	Report

CS CITY'US Tirgu-Mures, Târgu Mureș (ROU)

30 September 2011

Ilves FS (Finland)	2–4	(Croatia) MNK Split
	Report

CS CITY'US Tirgu-Mures, Târgu Mureș (ROU)

30 September 2011

Marca Futsal (Italy)	5–2	(Romania) City'US Târgu Mureş
	Report

CS CITY'US Tirgu-Mures, Târgu Mureș (ROU)

=== Group F ===
Team	Pts	Pld	W	D	L	GF	GA
(Serbia) Ekonomac Kragujevac	9	3	3	0	0	16	6
(Ukraine) Uragan Ivano-Frankivsk	6	3	2	0	1	15	11
(Cyprus) Omonia	3	3	1	0	2	7	12
(Israel) ASA Ben Gurion	0	3	0	0	3	7	14

27 September 2011

Ekonomac Kragujevac (Serbia)	6–2	(Israel) ASA Ben Gurion
	Report

Sports Hall Jezero, Kragujevac (SRB)

27 September 2011

Uragan Ivano-Frankivsk (Ukraine)	6–4	(Cyprus) Omonia
	Report

Sports Hall Jezero, Kragujevac (SRB)

28 September 2011

Ekonomac Kragujevac (Serbia)	5–1	(Cyprus) Omonia
	Report

Sports Hall Jezero, Kragujevac (SRB)

28 September 2011

ASA Ben Gurion (Israel)	4–6	(Ukraine) Uragan Ivano-Frankivsk
	Report

Sports Hall Jezero, Kragujevac (SRB)

30 September 2011

Omonia (Cyprus)	2–1	(Israel) ASA Ben Gurion
	Report

Sports Hall Jezero, Kragujevac (SRB)

30 September 2011

Uragan Ivano-Frankivsk (Ukraine)	3–5	(Serbia) Ekonomac Kragujevac
	Report

Sports Hall Jezero, Kragujevac (SRB)

== Elite round ==
=== Group A ===
Team	Pts	Pld	W	D	L	GF	GA
(Russia) MFK Dinamo Moskva	7	3	2	1	0	16	5
(Kazakhstan) Kairat Almaty	7	3	2	1	0	7	4
(Serbia) Ekonomac Kragujevac	3	3	1	0	2	5	13
(Belgium) A&M Châtelineau	0	3	0	0	3	6	12

17 November 2011

Kairat (Kazakhstan)	3–2	(Belgium) Châtelineau
Andre 8'; Moraes 19', 23'	Report	Chaibai 2'; Buranello 34'

Krylatskoye Sports Palace, Moscow (RUS)

17 November 2011

Dinamo Moskva (Russia)	9–1	(Serbia) Ekonomac
Tatù 3'; Fukin 15'; Fernandinho 20'; Kobzar 20'; Vinicius 24'; Rahimov 27'; Pula 36'; Cirilo 36'; Badretdinov 38'	Report	Rajčević 20'

Krylatskoye Sports Palace, Moscow (RUS)

18 November 2011

Ekonomac (Serbia)	0–2	(Kazakhstan) Kairat
	Report	Andre 4'; Leo Santana 12'

Krylatskoye Sports Palace, Moscow (RUS)

18 November 2011

Dinamo Moskva (Russia)	5–2	(Belgium) Châtelineau
Fukin 4', 16'; Rahimov 20'; Cirilo 21'; Vinicius 36'	Report	Chaibai 6'; Canaris 27'

Krylatskoye Sports Palace, Moscow (RUS)

20 November 2011

Châtelineau (Belgium)	2–4	(Serbia) Ekonomac
Chaibai 30'; Leo 38'	Report	Janjić 1', 12'; Rajčević 36' (2P), 39'

Krylatskoye Sports Palace, Moscow (RUS)

20 November 2011

Kairat (Kazakhstan)	2–2	(Russia) Dinamo Moskva
Fumaça 23'; Moraes 38'	Report	Fernandinho 1'; Cirilo 39'

Krylatskoye Sports Palace, Moscow (RUS)

=== Group B ===
Team	Pts	Pld	W	D	L	GF	GA
(Spain) Barcelona	7	3	2	1	0	12	2
(Azerbaijan) Araz Naxçivan	4	3	1	1	1	10	9
(Netherlands) CFE/VDL Groep	3	3	1	0	2	6	9
(Czech Republic) Era-Pack Chrudim	3	3	1	0	2	4	12

17 November 2011

Araz Naxçivan (Azerbaijan)	5–3	(Netherlands) CFE/VDL Groep
Amadeu 3', 7'; Tota 16', 40'; Borisov 17'	Report	Bali 2', 37'; Zouthane 34'

Palau Blaugrana, Barcelona (ESP)

17 November 2011

Barcelona (Spain)	6–0	(Czech Republic) Era-Pack Chrudim
Javi Rodríguez 2', 33', 36' (pen.); Wilde 8'; Torras 31'; Ari Santos 34'	Report

Palau Blaugrana, Barcelona (ESP)

18 November 2011

Era-Pack Chrudim (Czech Republic)	4–3	(Azerbaijan) Araz Naxçivan
Max 2'; Douglas 13'; Vladyka 24', 32'	Report	Borisov 10'; Farajzade 28'; Amadeu 34'

Palau Blaugrana, Barcelona (ESP)

18 November 2011

Barcelona (Spain)	4–0	(Netherlands) CFE/VDL Groep
Gabriel 11'; Saad Assis 17'; Torras 25'; Lin 29'	Report

Palau Blaugrana, Barcelona (ESP)

20 November 2011

Araz Naxçivan (Azerbaijan)	2–2	(Spain) Barcelona
Farajzade 20'; Amadeu 35'	Report	Wilde 9'; Lozano 15'

Palau Blaugrana, Barcelona (ESP)

20 November 2011

CFE/VDL Groep (Netherlands)	3–0	(Czech Republic) Era-Pack Chrudim
Lagouireh 5'; Bali 20'; Allouch 35'	Report

Palau Blaugrana, Barcelona (ESP)

=== Group C ===
Team	Pts	Pld	W	D	L	GF	GA
(Portugal) Sporting CP	7	3	2	1	0	13	9
(Georgia (country)) Iberia Star Tbilisi	4	3	1	1	1	14	17
(Romania) City'US Târgu Mureş	3	3	1	0	2	14	15
(Hungary) Győri ETO	3	3	1	0	2	13	13

16 November 2011
19:00 CET

Iberia Star Tbilisi (Georgia (country))	2–9	(Hungary) Győri ETO
Roninho 30'; Edu 33'	Report	Gyurcsányi 4'; Fabian 13', 26'; Jeferson 16'; Lódi 23', 24'; Al-Ioani 29', 38'; Harnisch 37'

Pavilhão Multiusos, Odivelas (POR)

16 November 2011
21:15 CET

Sporting CP (Portugal)	5–3	(Romania) City'US Târgu Mureş
Deo 1'; Matos 2', 16'; P. Cary 19'; Leitão 37'	Report	Ignat 6', 24'; Radu 27'

Pavilhão Multiusos, Odivelas (POR)

17 November 2011
: CET

City'US Târgu Mureş (Romania)	3–7	(Georgia (country)) Iberia Star Tbilisi
Matei 1'; Stoica 7', 18'	Report	Bruno Melo 1', 7'; Betinho 7'; Edu 12'; Sakai 14'; Luiz Baptista 27'; Altunashvili 30'

Pavilhão Multiusos, Odivelas (POR)

17 November 2011
: CET

Sporting CP (Portugal)	3–1	(Hungary) Győri ETO
Marcelinho 7'; Deo 9'; Pedro Cary 12'	Report	Al-Ioani 21'

Pavilhão Multiusos, Odivelas (POR)

19 November 2011
: CET

Győri ETO (Hungary)	3–8	(Romania) City'US Târgu Mureş
Elio Fabian 26', 31'; Gyurcsányi 27'	Report	Murilo Filho 7'; Lupu 8'; Ignat 10'; Alpar 29', 34', 40'; Radu 36'; Nicusan 37'

Pavilhão Multiusos, Odivelas (POR)
Attendance: Pavilhão Multiusos, Odivelas (POR)

19 November 2011
: CET

Iberia Star Tbilisi (Georgia (country))	5–5	(Portugal) Sporting CP
Bruno Melo 6'; Luiz Baptista 7', 25'; João Matos 14' (o.g.); Sakai 36'	Report	Marcelinho 20'; Deo 27', 30'; Alex 28'; Leitão 38'

Pavilhão Multiusos, Odivelas (POR)

=== Group D ===
Team	Pts	Pld	W	D	L	GF	GA
(Italy) Marca Futsal	7	3	2	1	0	9	5
(Italy) Montesilvano	5	3	1	2	0	5	4
(Ukraine) Uragan Ivano-Frankivsk	4	3	1	1	1	7	8
(Slovakia) Slov-Matic Bratislava	0	3	0	0	3	5	9

17 November 2011
18:30 CET

Montesilvano (Italy)	1–1	(Ukraine) Uragan Ivano-Frankivsk
Calderolli 31'	report	Shoturma 27'

PalaFabris, Padova
Referee: Pascal Lemal (BEL)
Second referee: Gábor Kovács (HUN)

17 November 2011
20:30 CET

Marca Futsal (Italy)	3–1	(Slovakia) Slov-Matic Bratislava
Foglia 1'; Pinto 21', 36'	report	Mikita 30'

PalaFabris, Padova
Referee: Antonis Constantinides (CYP)
Second referee: Kamil Çetin (TUR)

18 November 2011
18:30 CET

Slov-Matic Bratislava (Slovakia)	1–2	(Italy) Montesilvano
Fehervári 34'	report	Rogerio 21'; Cuzzolino 39'

PalaFabris, Padova
Referee: Kamil Çetin (TUR)
Second referee: Pascal Lemal (BEL)

18 November 2011
20:30 CET

Marca Futsal (Italy)	4–2	(Ukraine) Uragan Ivano-Frankovsk
Fabiano 9'; Pinto 5', 15'; Chilavert 37'	report	Simka 11'; Serjão 18'

PalaFabris, Padova
Referee: Gábor Kovács (HUN)
Second referee: Antonis Constantinides (CYP)

20 November 2011
:16:15 CET

Uragan Ivano-Frankivsk (Ukraine)	4–3	(Slovakia) Slov-Matic Bratislava
Simka 12', 32'; Shoturma 16'; Kordoba 24'	report	Rejžek 4'; Bartošek 30'; Sláma 33'

PalaFabris, Padova
Referee: Gábor Kovács (HUN)
Second referee: Kamil Çetin (TUR)

20 November 2011
18:30 CET

Montesilvano (Italy)	2–2	(Italy) Marca Futsal
Rogerio 11'; Calderolli 33'	report	Coco 6'; Pinto 28'

PalaFabris, Padova
Referee: Pascal Lemal (BEL)
Second referee: Antonis Constantinides (CYP)

== Final four ==
The following teams have qualified for the Final Four round:

- (Russia) MFK Dinamo Moskva
- (Spain) Barcelona
- Sporting Clube de Portugal
- (Italy) Marca Futsal

Semi-finals
27 April – Lleida
(Italy) Marca Futsal	0
(Russia) MFK Dinamo Moskva	3
27 April – Lleida
(Spain) Barcelona	5
(Portugal) Sporting CP	1

Final
29 April – Lleida
(Russia) MFK Dinamo Moskva	1
(Spain) Barcelona	3
Third place
29 April – Lleida
(Italy) Marca Futsal	3 (4)
(Portugal) Sporting CP	3 (3)

=== Semi-finals ===
27 April 2012	Marca Futsal	0–3	MFK Dinamo Moskva	Pavelló Barris Nord, Lleida
18:30 UTC+2		Report	Fernandinho 8'; Romulo 22', 39'	Referee: Bogdan Sorescu (ROU); Second referee: Borut Šivic (SVN)

27 April 2012	Barcelona	5–1	Sporting Clube de Portugal	Pavelló Barris Nord, Lleida
21:00 UTC+2	Ari 2'; Wilde 8', 30'; Igor 10'; Javi Rodríguez 16'	Report	Djô 31'	Referee: Gábor Kovács (HUN); Second referee: Oleg Ivanov (UKR)

=== 3rd and 4th place ===
29 April 2012	Marca Futsal	3–3 (a.e.t.) (4–3 p)	Sporting Clube de Portugal	Pavelló Barris Nord, Lleida
17:00 UTC+2	Papù 8'; Foglia 11', 34'	Report	Leitão 4', 4'; Cary 37'	Referee: Borut Šivic (SVN); Second referee: Oleg Ivanov (UKR)
	Penalties
	(penalty scored) Foglia; (penalty scored) Pinto; (penalty missed) Wilhelm; (penalty scored) Jeffe; (penalty scored) Duarte		Alex (penalty scored); Caio (penalty scored); Djô (penalty missed); Marcelinho (penalty scored); Galvão (penalty missed)

=== Final ===
29 April 2012	MFK Dinamo Moskva	1–3	Barcelona	Pavelló Barris Nord, Lleida
19:30 UTC+2	Rakhimov 36'	Report	Wilde 1'; Lin 23'; Jordi Torras 38'	Attendance: 5517; Referee: Gábor Kovács (HUN); Second referee: Bogdan Sorescu (ROU)

UEFA Futsal Cup
2011–12 Winners

Barcelona
1st Title
