= 2010–11 UEFA Futsal Cup =

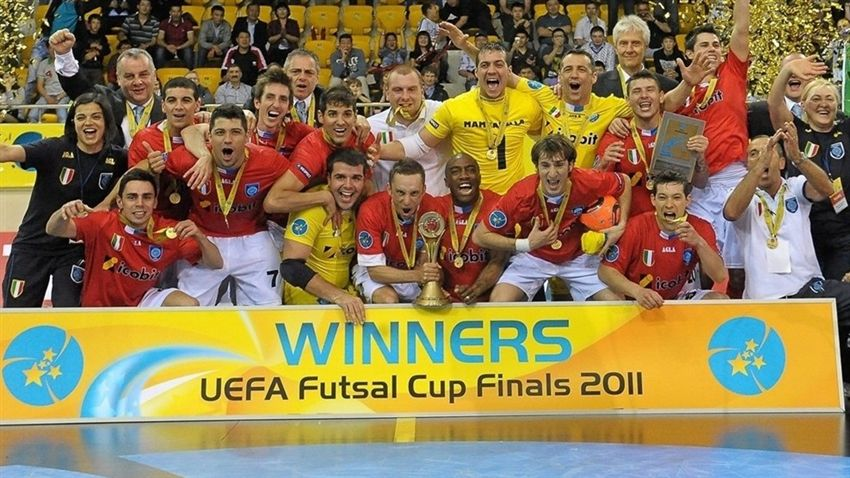

Tournament details
- Dates: 2010–2011
- Teams: 16 (Elite Round); 48 (Total)

Final positions
- Champions: (Italy) Montesilvano (1st title)
- Runners-up: (Portugal) Sporting CP

The 2010–11 UEFA Futsal Cup was the 25th edition of Europe's premier club futsal tournament and the 10th edition under the current UEFA Futsal Cup format.

Hosted in Almaty, Kazakhstan, it was won by Montesilvano in their tournament debut. This was the first victory for an Italian team.

== Teams ==
Elite round
(Portugal) Benfica ^{TH}	(Russia) Viz-Sinara Yekaterinburg	(Kazakhstan) Kairat	(Spain) ElPozo Murcia
Main round
(Belgium) Action 21 Charleroi	(Poland) Akademia FC Pniewy	(Azerbaijan) Araz Naxçivan	(Greece) Athina 90
(Romania) City'us Târgu Mureş	(Serbia) Ekonomac Kragujevac	(Czech Republic) Era-Pack Chrudim	(Georgia (country)) Iberia Star
(Slovenia) FC Kobarid	(Belarus) FC Mapid Minsk	(Italy) Montesilvano	(Croatia) Nacional Zagreb
(Latvia) Nikars Riga	(Slovakia) Slov-Matic	(Portugal) Sporting CP	(Israel) ASA Tel Aviv
(Ukraine) Time Lviv			
Preliminary round
(Estonia) Anzhi Tallinn	(Cyprus) Ararat Nicosia	(Denmark) BGA	(Switzerland) Croatia 97
(Germany) Croatia Berlin	(Montenegro) KMF Danilovgrad	(Netherlands) CF Eindhoven	(Andorra) FC Encamp
(Malta) ZC Excess Futsal	(Hungary) Győri ETO FC	(England) Helvécia Futsal	(Finland) Ilves Tampere
(Turkey) Istanbul Üniversitesi	(Armenia) FC Kaghsi Hrazdan	(Iceland) FC Keflavík	(Norway) KFUM Oslo
(France) Kremlin Bicêtre Utd	(Bulgaria) Levski Sofia West	(Lithuania) Nautara Kaunas	(Bosnia and Herzegovina) Orlić Sarajevo
(Scotland) Perth Saltires	(Republic of Ireland) Sporting Fingal	(Austria) Stella Rossa Wien	(Albania) KF Tirana
(Moldova) Tornado Chişinău	(Sweden) Vimmerby IF	(North Macedonia) Železarec Skopje	

== Preliminary round ==
=== Group A (Kaunas – LTU) ===
Team	Pts	Pld	W	D	L	GF	GA
(Republic of Ireland) Sporting Fingal EID	6	2	2	0	0	12	6
(Armenia) FC Kaghsi Hrazdan	3	2	1	0	1	5	8
(Lithuania) Nautara Kaunas	0	2	0	0	2	4	7

=== Group B (Cospicua – MLT) ===
Team	Pts	Pld	W	D	L	GF	GA
(Finland) Ilves FS Tampere	7	3	2	1	0	10	7
(Denmark) Futsal BGA	6	3	2	0	1	11	8
(Malta) ZC Excess Futsal	4	3	1	1	1	11	12
(Albania) KF Tirana	0	3	0	0	3	7	12

=== Group C (Vienna – AUT) ===
Team	Pts	Pld	W	D	L	GF	GA
(Bosnia and Herzegovina) MNK Orlić Sarajevo	9	3	3	0	0	26	8
(Moldova) Tornado Chişinău	6	3	2	0	1	16	13
(Austria) Stella Rossa Vienna	1	3	0	1	2	11	17
(Scotland) Perth Saltires	1	3	0	1	3	3	18

=== Group D (Nicosia – CYP) ===
Team	Pts	Pld	W	D	L	GF	GA
(Cyprus) AGBU Ararat	6	3	2	0	1	9	7
(Germany) SD Croatia Berlin	6	3	2	0	1	14	10
(Bulgaria) Levski Sofia Zapad	4	3	1	1	1	11	9
(Estonia) FC Anzhi Tallinn	1	3	0	1	2	8	16

=== Group E (Skopje – MKD) ===
Team	Pts	Pld	W	D	L	GF	GA
(North Macedonia) Železarec Skopje	7	3	2	1	0	17	7
(Norway) KFUM Oslo	7	3	2	1	0	15	7
(Montenegro) KMF Danilovgrad	3	3	1	0	2	12	13
(Turkey) Istanbul University	0	3	0	0	3	11	28

=== Group F (Győr – HUN) ===
Team	Pts	Pld	W	D	L	GF	GA
(Hungary) Győri ETO FC	9	3	3	0	0	23	5
(England) Helvécia Futsal	6	3	2	0	1	9	11
(Switzerland) MNK Croatia 97	3	3	1	0	2	17	13
(Andorra) FC Encamp	0	3	0	0	3	6	26

=== Group G (Hafnarfjörður – ISL) ===
Team	Pts	Pld	W	D	L	GF	GA
(France) Kremlin-Bicêtre United	7	3	2	1	0	38	10
(Netherlands) CFE/VDL Groep	7	3	2	1	0	31	9
(Iceland) Keflavík ÍF	3	3	1	0	2	20	39
(Sweden) Vimmerby IF	0	3	0	0	3	9	40

== Main round ==
=== Group 1 ===
Team	Pld	W	D	L	GF	GA	Pts
(Portugal) Sporting CP	3	3	0	0	9	3	9
(Slovakia) Slov-Matic	3	2	0	1	7	4	6
(Slovenia) FC Kobarid	3	1	0	2	7	7	3
(North Macedonia) Železarec Skopje	3	0	0	3	5	14	0

=== Group 2 ===
Team	Pld	W	D	L	GF	GA	Pts
(Ukraine) Time Lviv	3	3	0	0	16	5	9
(Cyprus) Ararat	3	1	1	1	7	9	4
(Bosnia and Herzegovina) Orlić	3	1	0	2	7	9	3
(Greece) Athina	3	0	1	2	8	15	1

=== Group 3 ===
Team	Pld	W	D	L	GF	GA	Pts
(Azerbaijan) Araz	3	3	0	0	17	7	9
(Romania) City'us Târgu Mureş	3	2	0	1	16	6	6
(Latvia) Nikars	3	1	0	2	7	15	3
(Republic of Ireland) Sporting Fingal EID	3	0	0	3	7	19	0

=== Group 4 ===
Team	Pld	W	D	L	GF	GA	Pts
(Georgia (country)) Iberia Star	3	2	1	0	16	9	7
(Czech Republic) Era-Pack	3	2	0	1	11	10	6
(Belarus) Mapid	3	1	0	2	9	13	3
(Hungary) Győri ETO	3	0	1	2	9	13	1

=== Group 5 ===
Team	Pld	W	D	L	GF	GA	Pts
(Italy) Montesilvano	3	3	0	0	14	3	9
(Croatia) Nacional Zagreb	3	1	1	1	10	5	4
(Israel) ASA Tel Aviv	3	1	1	1	10	11	4
(Finland) Ilves	3	0	0	3	5	20	0

=== Group 6 ===
Team	Pld	W	D	L	GF	GA	Pts
(Serbia) Ekonomac Kragujevac	3	3	0	0	13	4	9
(Poland) Akademia FCP	3	2	0	1	11	5	6
(Belgium) Action 21	3	1	0	2	13	9	3
(France) Kremlin Bicêtre Utd	3	0	0	3	1	20	0

== Elite round ==
=== Group 1 ===
Team	Pld	W	D	L	GF	GA	Pts
(Portugal) Benfica	3	3	0	0	8	3	9
(Serbia) Ekonomac Kragujevac	3	2	0	1	13	7	6
(Ukraine) Time Lviv	3	1	0	2	6	10	3
(Croatia) Nacional Zagreb	3	0	0	3	2	9	0

=== Group 2 ===
Team	Pld	W	D	L	GF	GA	Pts
(Italy) Montesilvano	3	2	1	0	14	3	7
(Russia) Sinara Ekaterinburg	3	2	0	1	16	5	6
(Azerbaijan) Araz Naxçivan	3	1	1	1	6	6	4
(Cyprus) Ararat Nicosia	3	0	0	3	2	24	0

=== Group 3 ===
Team	Pld	W	D	L	GF	GA	Pts
(Kazakhstan) Kairat Almaty	3	2	1	0	10	3	7
(Georgia (country)) Iberia Star Tbilisi	3	1	1	1	5	8	4
(Slovakia) Slov-Matic Bratislava	3	1	0	2	5	6	3
(Poland) Akademia Pniewy	3	1	0	2	5	8	3

=== Group 4 ===
Team	Pld	W	D	L	GF	GA	Pts
(Portugal) Sporting CP	3	2	1	0	13	8	7
(Spain) ElPozo Murcia	3	2	0	1	12	6	6
(Czech Republic) Era-Pack Chrudim	3	1	1	1	12	12	4
(Romania) City'us Târgu Mureş	3	0	0	3	6	17	0

== Final four ==
The following teams have qualified for the Final Four round:

- (Portugal) Benfica
- (Kazakhstan) Kairat
- (Italy) Montesilvano
- (Portugal) Sporting CP

Semi-finals
29 April – Almaty
(Portugal) Sporting	3
(Kazakhstan) Kairat	2
29 April – Almaty
(Portugal) Benfica	0
(Italy) Montesilvano	3

Final
1 May – Almaty
(Portugal) Sporting	2
(Italy) Montesilvano	5
Third place
1 May – Almaty
(Kazakhstan) Kairat	3(5)pen
(Portugal) Benfica	3(3)

=== Semi-finals ===
April 29, 2011	Sporting CP	3–2	Kairat	Baluan Sholak Palace of Culture and Sports, Almaty
14:30 CET	Divanei 24'; Caio Japa 27' 36'	Report	Leo Santana 34' 36'

April 29, 2011	Benfica	0–3	Montesilvano	Baluan Sholak Palace of Culture and Sports, Almaty
17:00 CET		Report	Leandro Cuzzolino 22'; Cristian Borruto 34'; Stefano Mammarella 35'

=== Final 3rd and 4th ===
May 1, 2011	Kairat	3–3 (5–3 p)	Benfica	Baluan Sholak Palace of Culture and Sports, Almaty
11:00 CET	Leo Santana 6'; Sidnei Silva 11'; Felipe 36'	Report	Joel Queirós 13'; Gonçalo 23'; César Paulo 30'

=== Final ===
May 1, 2011	Sporting CP	2–5	Montesilvano	Baluan Sholak Palace of Culture and Sports, Almaty
13:30 CET	Leitão 31' 38'	Report	Hernan Garcias 1'; Adriano Foglia 7' 11'; Fabricio Calderolli 19'; Leandro Cuzzolino 29'	Attendance: 2500

UEFA Futsal Cup
2010–11 Winners

Montesilvano
1st Title
