= Jani Korpela =

Finnish professional futsal player (born 1997)

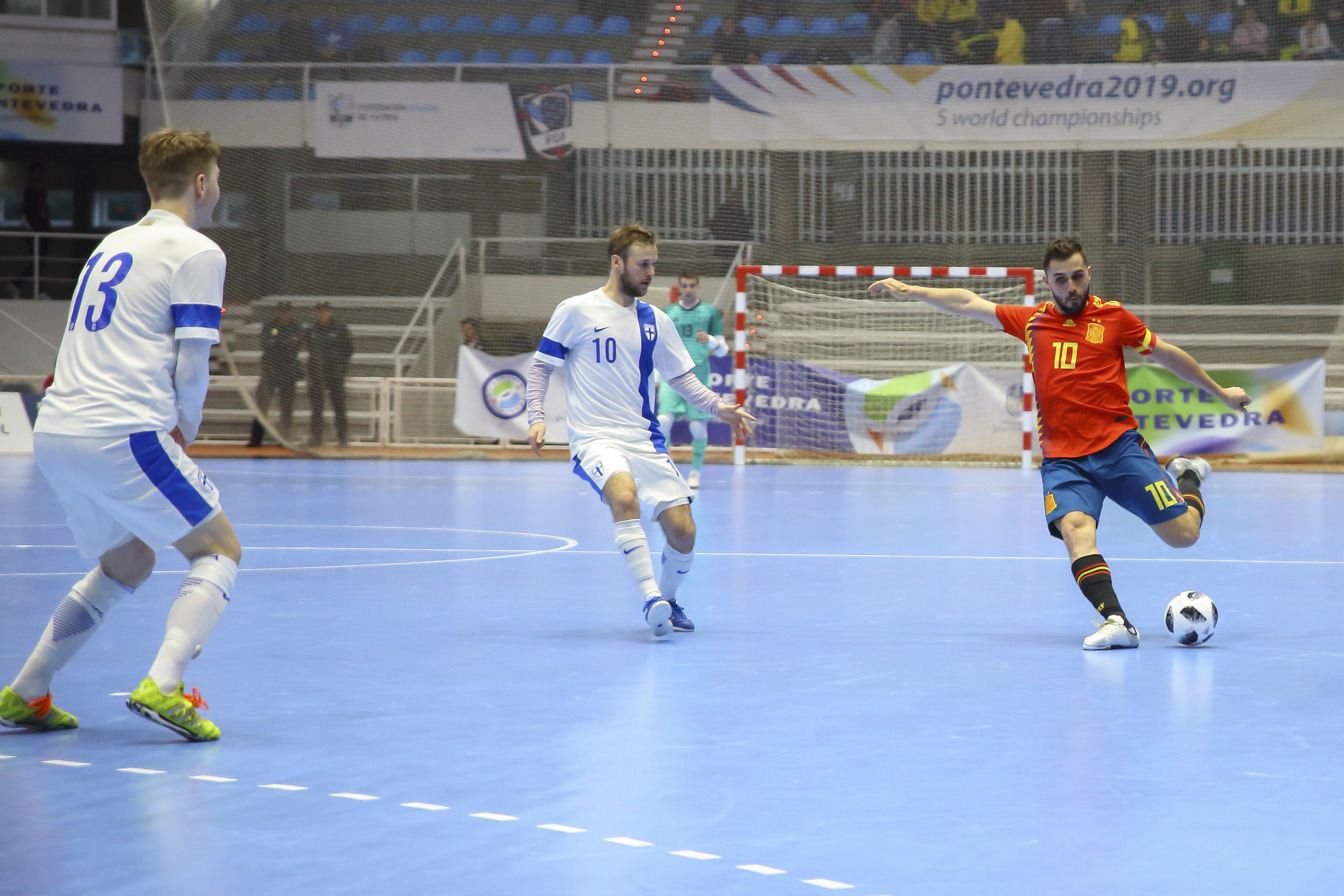
- Korpela (#13) and Miika Hosio playing against Spain in 2018

Personal information
- Date of birth: 8 July 1997 (age 29)
- Place of birth: Tampere, Finland
- Height: 1.89 m (6 ft 2 in)

Team information
- Current team: Inter Movistar
- Number: 13

Youth career
- Ilves FS

Senior career*
Years	Team	Apps	(Gls)
2014–2016	Ilves FS	47	(7)
2016–2019	Kampuksen Dynamo	97	(53)
2019–2021	Rekord Bielsko-Biała	41	(15)
2021–2022	MFK Torpedo		
2022	Kampuksen Dynamo	10	(7)
2022–2023	Rekord Bielsko-Biała	29	(12)
2023–	Inter Movistar	16	(1)

International career
2014–	Finland	119	(18)
- * Club domestic league appearances and goals as of 29 July 2024

Jani Korpela (born 8 July 1997) is a Finnish professional futsal player who plays for Spanish club Inter Movistar in Primera División de Futsal, and captains the Finland national futsal team. He represented Finland at the UEFA Futsal Euro 2022, which was their first ever appearance in the final tournament.

== Career ==
Korpela started futsal in his hometown club Ilves FS in Tampere. He has played for Ilves and Kampuksen Dynamo in Finnish Futsal-Liiga, for MFK Torpedo in Russian Futsal Super League, for Rekord Bielsko-Biała in Polish Futsal Ekstraklasa and for Inter Movistar in Spanish Primera División de Futsal.

== Honours ==
Rekord Bielsko-Biała

- Ekstraklasa Futsal: 2019–20, 2020–21
- Ekstraklasa Futsal runner-up: 2022–23
- Polish Futsal Cup: 2022–23
- Polish Futsal Super Cup: 2019–20, 2020–21, 2022–23

Kampuksen Dynamo

- Futsal-Liiga: 2017–18, 2018–19, 2021–22
- Futsal-Liiga runner-up: 2016–17

Ilves FS

- Futsal-Liiga runner-up: 2015–16

Individual

- Football Association of Finland: Futsal Player of the Season 2017–18, 2021–22, 2023–24
- Finnish Sports Journalists Union: Futsal Player of the Year 2023
