= 2014 Nordic Futsal Championship =

Nordic Futsal Championship 2014

Tournament details
- Host country: Finland
- City: Tampere
- Dates: 8–10 August 2014
- Teams: 5 (from 1 confederation)
- Venue: 1

Final positions
- Champions: (Norway) Vegakameratene (1st title)
- Runners-up: (Finland) Ilves
- Third place: (Finland) Golden Futsal Team
- Fourth place: (Denmark) Köbenhavn Futsal

Tournament statistics
- Matches played: 10
- Goals scored: 45 (4.5 per match)

The 2014 Nordic Futsal Championship, was the fourth edition of the Nordic Futsal Championship hosted by Tampere, Finland.

== Final standings ==
Team	Pld	W	D	L	GF	GA	GD	Pts
(Norway) Vegakameratene	4	3	1	0	9	4	+5	10
(Finland) Ilves	4	3	0	1	12	4	+8	9
(Finland) Golden Futsal Team	4	2	0	2	14	9	+5	6
(Denmark) Köbenhavn Futsal	4	1	1	2	8	12	−4	4
(Denmark) JB Futsal Gentofte	4	0	0	4	2	16	−14	0

== Matches and results ==
8 August 2014	Köbenhavn Futsal (Denmark)	1 – 5	(Finland) Ilves	Tampere
18:00				Stadium: Pirkkahalli Arena

8 August 2014	Vegakameratene (Norway)	3 – 0	(Denmark) Jægersborg Futsal Gentofte	Tampere
20:00				Stadium: Pirkkahalli Arena

9 August 2014	Köbenhavn Futsal (Denmark)	0 – 5	(Finland) Golden Futsal Team	Tampere
10:20				Stadium: Pirkkahalli Arena

9 August 2014	Jægersborg Futsal Gentofte (Norway)	0 – 3	(Finland) Ilves	Tampere
12:30				Stadium: Pirkkahalli Arena

9 August 2014	Vegakameratene (Norway)	1 – 1	(Denmark) Köbenhavn Futsal	Tampere
14:30				Stadium: Pirkkahalli Arena

9 August 2014	Golden Futsal Team (Finland)	4 – 1	(Denmark) Jægersborg Futsal Gentofte	Tampere
16:30				Stadium: Pirkkahalli Arena

9 August 2014	Ilves (Finland)	0 – 1	(Norway) Vegakameratene	Tampere
18:30				Stadium: Pirkkahalli Arena

10 August 2014	Golden Futsal Team (Finland)	3 – 4	(Norway) Vegakameratene	Tampere
11:00				Stadium: Pirkkahalli Arena

10 August 2014	Jægersborg Futsal Gentofte (Denmark)	1 – 6	(Denmark) Köbenhavn Futsal	Tampere
13:00				Stadium: Pirkkahalli Arena

10 August 2014	Ilves (Finland)	4 – 2	(Finland) Golden Futsal Team	Tampere
15:00				Stadium: Pirkkahalli Arena

== Awards ==
Nordic Futsal Championship
2014 Champions
(Norway)
Vegakameratene
First title

- Winner: (Norway) Vegakameratene
- Runners-up: (Finland) Ilves
- Third-Place: (Sweden) Golden Futsal Team
- Top scorer:
- Best Player:
