= 2013 Nordic Futsal Championship =

Nordic Futsal Championship 2013

Tournament details
- Host country: Sweden
- City: Stockholm
- Dates: 2–3 November 2013
- Teams: 4 (from 1 confederation)
- Venue: 1

Final positions
- Champions: (Finland) Ilves (1st title)
- Runners-up: (Norway) Vegakameratene
- Third place: (Denmark) JB Gentofte Futsal
- Fourth place: (Sweden) Stockholm All Stars

Tournament statistics
- Matches played: 6
- Goals scored: 44 (7.33 per match)

The 2013 Nordic Futsal Championship, was the Third edition of the Nordic Futsal Championship hosted by Stockholm, Sweden.

== Final standings ==
Team	Pld	W	D	L	GF	GA	GD	Pts
(Finland) Ilves	3	3	0	0	17	6	+11	9
(Norway) Vegakameratene	3	2	0	1	11	8	+3	6
(Denmark) JB Futsal Gentofte	3	1	0	2	9	10	−1	3
(Sweden) Stockholm All Stars	3	0	0	3	7	20	−13	0

== Matches and results ==
2 November 2013	Stockholm All Stars (Sweden)	2 – 7	(Finland) Ilves	Stockholm
12:00				Stadium: Farstahallarna

2 November 2013	Vegakameratene (Norway)	3 – 0	(Denmark) Jægersborg Futsal Gentofte	Stockholm
14:00				Stadium: Farstahallarna

2 November 2013	Stockholm All Stars (Sweden)	3 – 6	(Denmark) Jægersborg Futsal Gentofte	Stockholm
16:00				Stadium: Farstahallarna

2 November 2013	Ilves (Finland)	6 – 1	(Norway) Vegakameratene	Stockholm
18:00				Stadium: Farstahallarna

3 November 2013	Ilves (Finland)	4 – 3	(Denmark) Jægersborg Futsal Gentofte	Stockholm
10:30				Stadium: Farstahallarna

3 November 2013	Vegakameratene (Norway)	7 – 2	(Sweden) Stockholm All Stars	Stockholm
13:00				Stadium: Farstahallarna

== Awards ==
Nordic Futsal Championship
2013 Champions
(Finland)
Ilves
First title

- Winner: (Finland) Ilves
- Runners-up: (Norway) Vegakameratene
- Third-Place: (Denmark) Jægersborg Futsal Gentofte
- Top scorer:
- Best Player:
