= 2015 Nordic Futsal Championship =

Nordic Futsal Championship 2015

Tournament details
- Host country: Denmark
- City: Copenhagen
- Dates: 7–9 August 2015
- Teams: 6 (from 1 confederation)
- Venue: 1

Final positions
- Champions: (Finland) KaDy Futsal (1st title)
- Runners-up: (Finland) Ilves
- Third place: (Sweden) Göteborg Futsal Club
- Fourth place: (Denmark) Köbenhavn Futsal

Tournament statistics
- Matches played: 9
- Goals scored: 44 (4.89 per match)

The 2015 Nordic Futsal Championship was the fifth edition of the Nordic Futsal Championship hosted by Copenhagen, Denmark.

== Group stage ==
=== Group A ===
Team	Pld	W	D	L	GF	GA	GD	Pts
(Finland) Ilves	2	1	1	0	7	4	+3	4
(Sweden) Göteborg Futsal Club	2	1	1	0	7	5	+2	4
(Denmark) JB Futsal Gentofte	2	0	0	2	3	8	−5	0

7 August 2015	Jægersborg Futsal Gentofte (Denmark)	1 – 4	(Finland) Ilves	Copenhagen
19:30				Stadium: Nørrebrohallen

8 August 2015	Göteborg Futsal Club (Sweden)	4 – 2	(Denmark) Jægersborg Futsal Gentofte	Copenhagen
12:00				Stadium: Nørrebrohallen

8 August 2015	Ilves (Finland)	3 – 3	(Sweden) Göteborg Futsal Club	Copenhagen
16:00				Stadium: Nørrebrohallen

=== Group B ===
Team	Pld	W	D	L	GF	GA	GD	Pts
(Finland) KaDy Futsal	2	2	0	0	6	3	+3	6
(Denmark) København Futsal	2	1	0	1	6	6	0	3
(Denmark) FC Fjordbold	2	0	0	2	4	7	−3	0

7 August 2015	FC Fjordbold (Denmark)	3 – 4	(Denmark) København Futsal	Copenhagen
18:00				Stadium: Nørrebrohallen

8 August 2015	KaDy Futsal (Finland)	3 – 1	(Denmark) FC Fjordbold	Copenhagen
10:00				Stadium: Nørrebrohallen

8 August 2015	København Futsal (Denmark)	2 – 3	(Finland) KaDy Futsal	Copenhagen
14:00				Stadium: Nørrebrohallen

== Final round ==
=== 5th/6th place match ===
9 August 2015	Jægersborg Futsal Gentofte (Denmark)	2 – 0	(Denmark) FC Fjordbold	Copenhagen
10:00				Stadium: Nørrebrohallen

=== Third place match ===
9 August 2015	Göteborg Futsal Club (Sweden)	4 – 1	(Denmark) Köbenhavn Futsal	Copenhagen
12:00				Stadium: Nørrebrohallen

=== Final ===
9 August 2015	KaDy Futsal (Finland)	2 – 2 (3 – 2 p)	(Finland) Ilves	Copenhagen
14:00				Stadium: Nørrebrohallen

== Awards ==
Nordic Futsal Championship
2015 champions

KaDy Futsal
First title

- Winner: (Finland) KaDy Futsal
- Runners-up: (Finland) Ilves
- Third-Place: (Sweden) Göteborg Futsal Club
- Top scorer:
- Best Player:

== Final standing ==
Rank	Team
1st place, gold medalist(s)	(Finland) SoVo Futsal
2nd place, silver medalist(s)	(Finland) Ilves
3rd place, bronze medalist(s)	(Sweden) Göteborg Futsal Club
4	(Denmark) Köbenhavn Futsal
5	(Denmark) Jægersborg Futsal Gentofte
6	(Denmark) FC Fjordbold
