= Nordic Futsal Championship =

- Founded: 2006
- Region: Nordic countries (UEFA)
- Teams: 6
- Current champions: (Finland) SoVo Futsal (1st title)
- Most championships: Solør Futsal; Stockholm All Stars; Ilves; Vegakameratene; KaDy Futsal; Sandefjord; SoVo Futsal (1st title)
- Website: https://www.facebook.com/nordicfutsal/
- 2017 Nordic Futsal Championship

The Nordic Futsal Championships, or in short NFC, was arranged 2006 for the first time in Stockholm by Stockholm Futsal Club. It is a club competition for the champions in each Nordic country (Finland, Denmark, Norway and Sweden).

NFC was started back in 2006 when Stockholm Futsal Club invited all the Nordic champions to determine what team was the best in the Nordics in futsal. The cup has since then been played several times but since 2013 it is an annual cup. At the cup 2013 the participating clubs agreed on a format of the cup saying the winners will arrange the next cup as a preparation for the UEFA-cup. Since then the cup is played annually, a couple of weeks before the UEFA-cup qualifying round in August. Deliberately there are no statutes or regulations for the cup, so just like the whisper game it tends to shift from year to year in the format. The ambition was to let the winning club continue to develop the cup and make it better from year to year and with sanction from each football federation.

No one can claim ownership of the cup, the cup is a virtual cup with no one responsible other than the current Nordic Champions. The only information to be found is on the cup Facebook page where the host of the cup will inform of the next cup.

== Summaries ==
Year	Host	Final			Third Place			Number of teams
Year	Host	Winner	Score	Runner-up	Third Place	Score	Fourth Place	Number of teams
2006; Details	(Sweden); Stockholm	Solør Futsal (Norway)	No playoffs	(Sweden) Stockholm All Stars	Mad Max (Finland)	No playoffs	(Denmark) BGA futsal	4
2007; Details	(Finland); Åbo	Stockholm All Stars (Sweden)	No playoffs	(Norway) Solør Futsa	Åbo All stars (Finland)	No playoffs	(Finland) Helsingfors	4
2013; Details	(Sweden); Stockholm	Ilves (Finland)	No playoffs	(Norway) Vegakameratene	JB Gentofte Futsal (Denmark)	No playoffs	(Sweden) Stockholm All Stars	4
2014; Details	(Finland); Tampere	Vegakameratene (Norway)	No playoffs	(Finland) Ilves	Golden Futsal Team (Finland)	No playoffs	(Denmark) Köbenhavn Futsal	5
2015; Details	(Denmark); Copenhagen	KaDy Futsal (Finland)	2 – 2 (5 – 4) pen	(Finland) Ilves	Göteborg Futsal Club (Sweden)	4 – 1	(Denmark) Köbenhavn Futsal	6
2016; Details	(Sweden); Gothenburg	Sandefjord (Norway)	No playoffs	(Finland) Golden Futsal Team	IFK Göteborg Futsal (Sweden)	No playoffs	(Denmark) Köbenhavn Futsal	6
2017; Details	(Finland); Espoo	SoVo Futsal (Finland)	3 – 2	(Finland) Golden Futsal Team	Köbenhavn Futsal (Denmark)	5 – 0	(Finland) Sievi	6

== Records and statistics ==
=== Winners by nation ===
Rank	Nation	Gold	Silver	Bronze	Total
1	Finland	3	4	3	10
2	Norway	3	2	0	5
3	Sweden	1	1	2	4
4	Denmark	0	0	2	2
Totals (4 entries)		7	7	7	21

=== Winners by club ===
Club	Winner	Runner-up	Years won	Years runner-up
(Finland) Ilves	1	2	2013	2014, 2015
(Norway) Solør Futsal	1	1	2006	2007
(Sweden) Stockholm All Stars	1	1	2007	2006
(Norway) Vegakameratene	1	1	2014	2013
(Finland) KaDy Futsal	1	0	2015	
(Norway) Sandefjord	1	0	2016	
(Finland) SoVo Futsal	1	0	2017	
(Finland) Golden Futsal Team	0	2		2016, 2017
