= Edgar Varela =

Edgar Varela may refer to:

- Edgar Varela (baseball) (born 1980), American baseball coach and former player
- Edgar Varela (futsal) (born 1996), Portuguese futsal player
