= Badosa =

Badosa is a Spanish surname. Notable people with the surname include:

- Enrique Badosa (1927–2021), Spanish writer and translator
- Jordi Torras Badosa (born 1980), Spanish futsal player
- Paula Badosa (born 1997), Spanish tennis player
