= Rekord Bielsko-Biała (futsal) =

BTS Rekord Bielsko-Biała
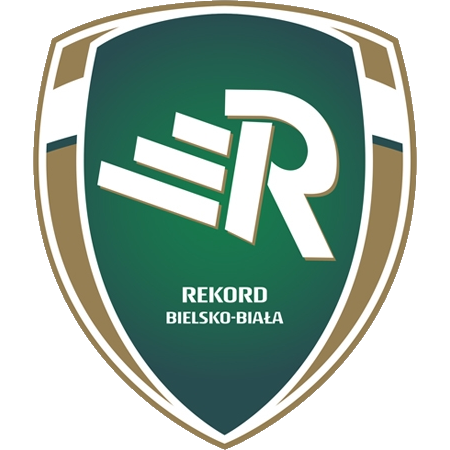
- Full name: Beskidzkie Towarzystwo Sportowe Rekord Bielsko-Biała
- Founded: 1994; 32 years ago
- Ground: Centrum Sportu Rekord
- Capacity: 300
- President: Janusz Szymura
- Head coach: Jesús Chus López García
- League: Ekstraklasa
- 2025–26: Ekstraklasa, 4th of 16
- Website: https://bts.rekord.com.pl
Home colours

BTS Rekord Bielsko-Biała is a Polish futsal club based in Bielsko-Biała. As of the 2025–26 season, they compete in the Ekstraklasa, the top tier of Polish futsal. The most successful futsal club in Poland, they have won seven top-flight league titles, seven Polish Cups and seven Super Cups, and hold the record for the most wins in each competition.

== History ==
BTS Lipnik Bielsko-Biała was founded in 1994 with support of Janusz Szymura, president of the music label "Rekord", at an amateur football club based in the Lipnik district. While still maintaining the football department, Rekord switched its focus to futsal competitions, becoming one of the founders of the national championship. Except for the 1999–2000 season, Rekord played in the Ekstraklasa from 1994 to 2006, when it was relegated to the second division. In May 2000, the club changed its name to the BTS Rekord Lipnik Bielsko-Biała, and then to BTS Rekord Bielsko-Biała in June 2001. The return to the top flight in 2009 coincided with the beginning of a winning cycle that projected Rekord to the top of the Polish pentacalcio. In the 2012–13 season, the team led by Andrea Bucciol won the Polish Cup, the club's first national honour; in the following season, with Adam Kryger in charge, Rekord recorded a double by winning the national title and the Super Cup. In their UEFA Futsal Cup debut the 2014–15 season, Rekord recorded a win against Georgian club Iberia Star Tbilisi and two defeats before finishing 2nd in their group and exiting the competition.

== Current squad ==
As of 16 May 2026

Note: Flags indicate national team as defined under FIFA eligibility rules; some limited exceptions apply. Players may hold more than one non-FIFA nationality.

No.	Pos.	Nation	Player
3	Winger	POL	Miłosz Krzempek
4	Defender	SRB	Jakub Wiertelorz
6	Winger	POL	Mikołaj Zastawnik
8	Winger	AUT	Gustavo Henrique Steinawandter
10	Winger	POL	Paweł Budniak
11	Winger	BRA	Miguel Kenji
11	Winger	BRA	Guilherme Kadu
13	Defender	SVK	Martin Doša
15	Winger	POL	Grzegorz Haraburda
16	Defender	POL	Piotr Wykręt
19	Winger	ARG	Franco Spellanzon
20	Goalkeeper	POL	Jakub Florek
21	Pivot	POL	Michał Marek
22	Pivot	POL	Kacper Pawlus
24	Goalkeeper	POL	Michał Kałuża
25	Goalkeeper	POL	Kacper Ślęzak
77	Winger	POR	Edgar Varela

== Honours ==
- Ekstraklasa:
  - Champions: 2013–14, 2016–17, 2017–18, 2018–19, 2019–20, 2020–21, 2023–24
  - Runners-up: 1995–96, 2021–22
  - Third place: 2010–11, 2011–12, 2014–15, 2015–16
- Polish Cup
  - Winners: 2012–13, 2017–18, 2018–19, 2021–22, 2022–23, 2024–25, 2025–26
  - Runners-up: 2014–15, 2015–16, 2016–17
- Polish Super Cup
  - Winners: 2013, 2017, 2018, 2019, 2022, 2023, 2024
  - Runners-up: 2014, 2021, 2025, 2026

== European competitions record ==
Season	Competition	Round	Country	Club	Result	Venue (Host City)	Qualified
2014–15	UEFA Futsal Cup	Preliminary round (Group C)	(Scotland)	Perth Saltires	10–0	Hala Pod; Dębowcem (Bielsko-Biała)	1st place
2014–15	UEFA Futsal Cup	Preliminary round (Group C)	(Lithuania)	FK Lokomotyvas	5–2	Hala Pod; Dębowcem (Bielsko-Biała)	1st place
2014–15	UEFA Futsal Cup	Preliminary round (Group C)	(Finland)	Ilves FS	2–1	Hala Pod; Dębowcem (Bielsko-Biała)	1st place
2014–15	UEFA Futsal Cup	Main round (Group 2)	(Georgia (country))	Iberia Star Tbilisi	4–0	Olimpiskais sporta centrs (Riga)	2nd place
2014–15	UEFA Futsal Cup	Main round (Group 2)	(Latvia)	FK Nikars Riga	1–3	Olimpiskais sporta centrs (Riga)	2nd place
2014–15	UEFA Futsal Cup	Main round (Group 2)	(Bulgaria)	Grand Pro Varna	0–2	Olimpiskais sporta centrs (Riga)	2nd place
2017–18	UEFA Futsal Cup	Preliminary round (Group G)	(Northern Ireland)	Belfast United	20–3	Svendborg; Idrætscenter (Svendborg)	1st place
2017–18	UEFA Futsal Cup	Preliminary round (Group G)	(Greece)	A.C. Doukas	4–0	Svendborg; Idrætscenter (Svendborg)	1st place
2017–18	UEFA Futsal Cup	Preliminary round (Group G)	(Denmark)	København	6–3	Svendborg; Idrætscenter (Svendborg)	1st place
2017–18	UEFA Futsal Cup	Main round (Group 6)	(Slovakia)	Slov-Matic	2–5	Inter Hala; Pasienky (Bratislava)	3rd place
2017–18	UEFA Futsal Cup	Main round (Group 6)	(Georgia (country))	STU Telasi	1–0	Inter Hala; Pasienky (Bratislava)	3rd place
2017–18	UEFA Futsal Cup	Main round (Group 6)	(Netherlands)	ZVV 't Knooppunt	1–3	Inter Hala; Pasienky (Bratislava)	3rd place
2018–19	UEFA Futsal; Champions League	Preliminary round (Group G)	(Wales)	Cardiff University	10–1	Hala Pod; Dębowcem (Bielsko-Biała)	1st place
2018–19	UEFA Futsal; Champions League	Preliminary round (Group G)	(Luxembourg)	Racing Luxembourg	11–2	Hala Pod; Dębowcem (Bielsko-Biała)	1st place
2018–19	UEFA Futsal; Champions League	Preliminary round (Group G)	(Bulgaria)	Varna City	2–1	Hala Pod; Dębowcem (Bielsko-Biała)	1st place
2018–19	UEFA Futsal; Champions League	Main round (Group 7)	(Latvia)	FK Nikars Riga	7–0	Zemgale; Olympic Center (Jelgava)	1st place
2018–19	UEFA Futsal; Champions League	Main round (Group 7)	(Germany)	Hohenstein-Ernstthal	5–1	Zemgale; Olympic Center (Jelgava)	1st place
2018–19	UEFA Futsal; Champions League	Main round (Group 7)	(Romania)	Informatica Timişoara	1–1	Zemgale; Olympic Center (Jelgava)	1st place
2018–19	UEFA Futsal; Champions League	Elite round (Group B)	(Russia)	Gazprom-Ugra Yugorsk	3–4	Palau Blaugrana (Barcelona)	4th place
2018–19	UEFA Futsal; Champions League	Elite round (Group B)	(Spain)	FC Barcelona	1–3	Palau Blaugrana (Barcelona)	4th place
2018–19	UEFA Futsal; Champions League	Elite round (Group B)	(Serbia)	Ekonomac	4–8	Palau Blaugrana (Barcelona)	4th place
2019–20	UEFA Futsal; Champions League	Main round (Group 5)	(Malta)	Luxol St Andrews	3–1	UNYP Arena (Prague)	3rd place
2019–20	UEFA Futsal; Champions League	Main round (Group 5)	(Romania)	Miercurea Ciuc	1–2	UNYP Arena (Prague)	3rd place
2019–20	UEFA Futsal; Champions League	Main round (Group 5)	(Czech Republic)	Sparta Praha	1–4	UNYP Arena (Prague)	3rd place
2020–21	UEFA Futsal; Champions League	Preliminary round	(Wales)	Swansea University	6–0	Hala Pod; Dębowcem (Bielsko-Biała)	
2020–21	UEFA Futsal; Champions League	Round of 32	(Romania)	United Galați	3–6	Hala Pod; Dębowcem (Bielsko-Biała)	
2021–22	UEFA Futsal; Champions League	Main round (Group 5)	(Sweden)	Hammarby	7–2	Tal-Qroqq University; Sports Hall (Gżira)	2nd place
2021–22	UEFA Futsal; Champions League	Main round (Group 5)	(Hungary)	Haladás	3–4	Tal-Qroqq University; Sports Hall (Gżira)	2nd place
2021–22	UEFA Futsal; Champions League	Main round (Group 5)	(Malta)	Luxol St Andrews	1–1	Tal-Qroqq University; Sports Hall (Gżira)	2nd place
2024–25	UEFA Futsal; Champions League	Main round (Group 1)	(Spain)	Jimbee Cartagena	1–1	Belleheide Center (Roosdaal)	2nd place
2024–25	UEFA Futsal; Champions League	Main round (Group 1)	(Belgium)	Anderlecht	3–1	Belleheide Center (Roosdaal)	2nd place
2024–25	UEFA Futsal; Champions League	Main round (Group 1)	(Ukraine)	HIT Kyiv	2–2	Belleheide Center (Roosdaal)	2nd place
2024–25	UEFA Futsal; Champions League	Elite round (Group D)	(Slovakia)	MIMEL Lučenec	3–1	Palau Municipal d'Esports; Son Moix (Palma)	3nd place
2024–25	UEFA Futsal; Champions League	Elite round (Group D)	(Kazakhstan)	Futsal Club Semey	0–5	Palau Municipal d'Esports; Son Moix (Palma)	3nd place
2024–25	UEFA Futsal; Champions League	Elite round (Group D)	(Spain)	Palma Futsal	3–3	Palau Municipal d'Esports; Son Moix (Palma)	3nd place
