= Rekord Bielsko-Biała =

Rekord Bielsko-Biała may refer to:

- Rekord Bielsko-Biała (futsal), futsal team of the BTS Rekord Bielsko-Biała club
- Rekord Bielsko-Biała (football), association football team of the BTS Rekord Bielsko-Biała club
