= Vegakameratene =

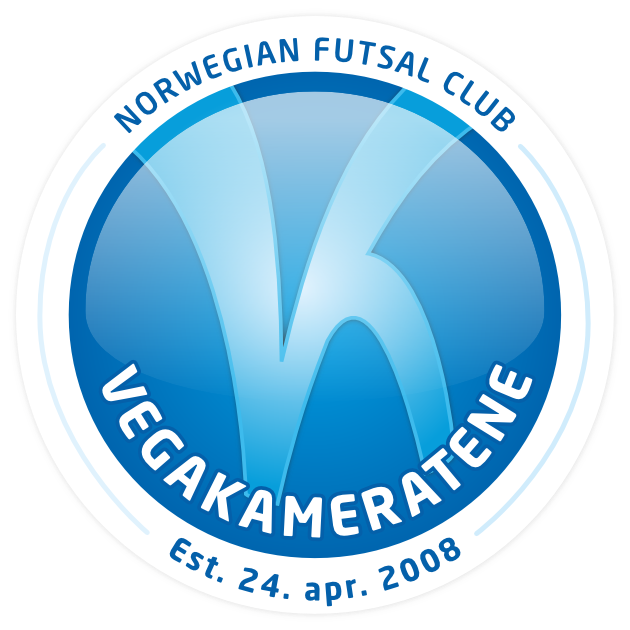
- Founded: 24 April 2008; 18 years ago
- Chairman: Alf Einar Grimsø
- Manager: Kai Bardal
- League: Eliteserien
Home colours	Away colours

Vegakameratene (founded 24 April 2008) is a Norwegian futsal team currently playing in Eliteserien, the Norwegian top division. The club is currently based in Trondheim, but has origins at the island of Vega in Nordland county. It has been a part of the top division since the creation of the league in 2008/2009, and has since its first league title in 2010/2011 been able to defend the title three consecutive times. As Norwegian champions, Vegakameratene has represented Norway in the UEFA Futsal Cup four times, and was the first Norwegian team advancing to the Main round back in 2011. In 2014, the team was admitted directly to the Main round, after being ranked as the 17th best team participating.

== Eliteserien ==
Season	League									Ref.
Season	Divisjon	P	W	D	L	+	-	Pts	Rank	Ref.
2008/09	Eliteserien	18	11	1	6	96	66	34	4	
2009/10	Eliteserien	18	14	0	4	69	48	42	2	
2010/11	Eliteserien	18	16	1	1	91	27	49	1	
2011/12	Eliteserien	18	13	1	4	75	33	40	1	
2012/13	Eliteserien	18	13	3	2	80	28	42	1	
2013/14	Eliteserien	18	15	3	0	74	18	48	1	

== UEFA Futsal Cup ==
Season	Round	Opponent		Result	Arena	Location
2011–12	Preliminary Round	(Bulgaria)	Varna	5–3	Palace of Culture and Sports	Varna
2011–12	Preliminary Round	(Denmark)	BGA	3–2	Palace of Culture and Sports	Varna
2011–12	Preliminary Round	(Iceland)	Fjölnir	4–1	Palace of Culture and Sports	Varna
2011–12	Main Round	(Czech Republic)	Era-Pack Chrudim	2–6	Arena Poznan	Poznań
2011–12	Main Round	(Poland)	Akademia FC Pniewy	2–3	Arena Poznan	Poznań
2011–12	Main Round	(Belgium)	A&M Châtelineau	2–2	Arena Poznan	Poznań
2012–13	Preliminary Round	(Andorra)	FC Encamp	4–2	Poliesportiu d'Andorra	Andorra la Vella
2012–13	Preliminary Round	(Israel)	Maccabi Nahalat Itzhak	0–0	Poliesportiu d'Andorra	Andorra la Vella
2012–13	Preliminary Round	(Armenia)	Shahumyan	4–1	Poliesportiu d'Andorra	Andorra la Vella
2012–13	Main Round	(Serbia)	KMF Ekonomac Kragujevac	2–6	Olympic Sports Centre, Riga	Riga
2012–13	Main Round	(Latvia)	FK Nikars	1–2	Olympic Sports Centre, Riga	Riga
2012–13	Main Round	(North Macedonia)	KMF Zelezarec Skopje	4–2	Olympic Sports Centre, Riga	Riga
2013–14	Preliminary Round	(Turkey)	Fırat Üniversitesi Elazığ	6–2	Hollgasse Hall	Vienna
2013–14	Preliminary Round	(Switzerland)	Futsal Minerva	2–1	Hollgasse Hall	Vienna
2013–14	Preliminary Round	(Austria)	Stella Rossa Wien	2–2	Hollgasse Hall	Vienna
2013–14	Main round	(Netherlands)	CF Eindhoven	0–3	Jezero Hall	Kragujevac
2013–14	Main round	(Serbia)	KMF Ekonomac Kragujevac	1–5	Jezero Hall	Kragujevac
2013–14	Main round	(Croatia)	MNK Nacional Zagreb	0–2	Jezero Hall	Kragujevac
2014–15	Main Round	(Hungary)	MVFC Berettyóújfalu	2–3	Pálffy István Rendezvénycsarnok	Berettyóújfalu
2014–15	Main Round	(Slovakia)	Slov-Matic Bratislava	0–3	Pálffy István Rendezvénycsarnok	Berettyóújfalu
2014–15	Main Round	(Cyprus)	APOEL FC	3–3	Pálffy István Rendezvénycsarnok	Berettyóújfalu

== Coach ==
Kai Bardal has been the coach of Vegakameratene since its foundation in 2008.
