= Extraliga žen =

Extraliga žen (lit. 'Women's Extraliga') may refer to any of several premier women's national championship sports leagues in the Czech Republic:

- Czech Women's Extraliga, an ice hockey league
- Czech Women's Volleyball Extraliga, a volleyball league
- Extraliga žen ve florbale, a floorball league

== See also ==
- Extraliga (disambiguation)
