= 2017 Nordic Futsal Championship =

Nordic Futsal Championship 2017

Tournament details
- Host country: Finland
- City: Espoo
- Dates: 11–13 August 2017
- Teams: 6 (from 1 confederation)
- Venues: 2

Final positions
- Champions: (Finland) SoVo Futsal (1st title)
- Runners-up: (Finland) Golden Futsal Team
- Third place: (Denmark) Köbenhavn Futsal
- Fourth place: (Finland) Sievi

Tournament statistics
- Matches played: 9
- Goals scored: 59 (6.56 per match)

The 2017 Nordic Futsal Championship, was the seventh edition of the Nordic Futsal Championship hosted by Espoo, Finland.

== Group stage ==
=== Group A ===
| Team | Pld | W | D | L | GF | GA | GD | Pts |
|---|---|---|---|---|---|---|---|---|
| (Finland) Golden Futsal Team | 2 | 2 | 0 | 0 | 12 | 5 | +7 | 6 |
| (Denmark) Köbenhavn Futsal | 2 | 0 | 1 | 1 | 3 | 5 | −2 | 1 |
| (Finland) Ilves | 2 | 0 | 1 | 1 | 4 | 9 | −5 | 1 |

| 11 August 2017 | Golden Futsal Team (Finland) | 4 – 2 | (Denmark) Köbenhavn Futsal | Espoo |
| 19:45 | | | | Stadium: Leppavaara |

| 12 August 2017 | Köbenhavn Futsal (Denmark) | 1 – 1 | (Finland) Ilves | Espoo |
| 10:00 | | | | Stadium: Opinmäki |

| 12 August 2017 | Golden Futsal Team (Finland) | 8 – 3 | (Finland) Ilves | Espoo |
| 16:00 | | | | Stadium: Opinmäki |

=== Group B ===
| Team | Pld | W | D | L | GF | GA | GD | Pts |
|---|---|---|---|---|---|---|---|---|
| (Finland) SoVo Futsal | 2 | 2 | 0 | 0 | 13 | 6 | +7 | 6 |
| (Finland) Sievi | 2 | 1 | 0 | 1 | 5 | 7 | −2 | 3 |
| (Denmark) FC Fjordbold | 2 | 0 | 0 | 2 | 6 | 11 | −5 | 0 |

| 11 August 2017 | FC Fjordbold (Denmark) | 4 – 8 | (Finland) SoVo Futsal | Espoo |
| 19:45 | | | | Stadium: Opinmäki |

| 12 August 2017 | Sievi (Finland) | 2 – 5 | (Finland) SoVo Futsal | Espoo |
| 12:30 | | | | Stadium: Opinmäki |

| 12 August 2017 | FC Fjordbold (Denmark) | 2 – 3 | (Finland) Sievi | Espoo |
| 18:30 | | | | Stadium: Opinmäki |

== Final round ==
=== 5th/6th place match ===
| 13 August 2017 | Ilves (Finland) | 5 – 1 | (Denmark) FC Fjordbold | Espoo |
| 12:30 | | | | Stadium: Opinmäki |

=== Third place match ===
| 13 August 2017 | Köbenhavn Futsal (Denmark) | 5 – 0 | (Finland) Sievi | Espoo |
| 10:30 | | | | Stadium: Opinmäki |

=== Final ===
| 13 August 2017 | SoVo Futsal (Finland) | 3 – 2 | (Finland) Golden Futsal Team | Espoo |
| 10:30 | | | | Stadium: Opinmäki |

== Awards ==
Nordic Futsal Championship
2017 champions

First title

- Winner: (Finland) SoVo Futsal
- Runners-up: (Finland) Golden Futsal Team
- Third-Place: (Denmark) Köbenhavn Futsal
- Top scorer:
- Best Player:

== Final standing ==
| Rank | Team |
|---|---|
| 1st place, gold medalist(s) | (Finland) SoVo Futsal |
| 2nd place, silver medalist(s) | (Finland) Golden Futsal Team |
| 3rd place, bronze medalist(s) | (Denmark) Köbenhavn Futsal |
| 4 | (Finland) Sievi |
| 5 | (Finland) Ilves |
| 6 | (Denmark) FC Fjordbold |
