= Georgian Futsal League =

- Founded: 1994
- Country: Georgia
- Confederation: UEFA
- Number of clubs: 10
- Level on pyramid: 1
- International cup: UEFA Futsal Cup
- Current champions: FC CIU
- Most championships: Iberia Star
- Website: gff.ge
- Current: Current Season at UEFA.com

The Georgian Futsal League is the premier futsal league in Georgia, organized by Georgian Football Federation.

== Champions ==
Season	Winner
1994/95	Vake Tbilisi
1995/96	Baasi Bagdadi
1996/97	Baasi Bagdadi
1997/98	Baasi Bagdadi
1998/99	Baasi Bagdadi
1999/00	Baasi Bagdadi
2000/01	Baasi Bagdadi
2001/02	Iberia 2000 Tbilisi
2002/03	Iberia 2000 Tbilisi
2003/04	Iberia 2003 Tbilisi
2004/05	Iberia 2003 Tbilisi
2005/06	Iberia 2003 Tbilisi
2006/07	Iberia 2003 Tbilisi
2007/08	Iberia 2003 Tbilisi
2008/09	Iberia 2003 Tbilisi
2009/10	Iberia Star
2010/11	Iberia Star
2011/12	Iberia Star
2012/13	Iberia Star
2013/14	Iberia Star
2014/15	Georgians Tbilisi
2015/16	Tbilisi SU
2016/17	Georgians Tbilisi
2017/18	MFC Tatishvili
2018/19	Georgians Tbilisi
2019/20	Tbilisi SU
2020/21	KSU-CIU
2021/22	Georgians Tbilisi
2022/23	Georgians Tbilisi
2023/24	Georgians Tbilisi
2024/25	FC CIU
2025/26	FC CIU
