= Extraliga =

The Extraliga may refer to any of the top-division ice hockey leagues in former Czechoslovakia:

- Czechoslovak First Ice Hockey League, which in 1993 was divided to:
  - Czech Extraliga
  - Slovak Extraliga
- Belarusian Extraliga

It may also refer to:

- Czech Baseball Extraliga, the top baseball league in Czechia.
- KB Extraliga, the top rugby union competition in Czechia.
- Extra-Liga, the top futsal league in Ukraine.
- Slovak Futsal Extraliga, Slovakian futsal league.
- Extraliga žen ve florbale, the top women's floorball league in Czechia.
