= Edgar Varela (futsal) =

Portuguese futsal player

Personal information
- Full name: Edgar Ramos Mendes Varela
- Date of birth: 2 March 1996 (age 30)
- Place of birth: Portugal
- Height: 1.76 m (5 ft 9 in)
- Position: Winger

Team information
- Current team: Rekord Bielsko-Biała
- Number: 77

Youth career
- 2006–2009: FC Outurela (football)
- 2009–2010: Shotokai Queluz
- 2010–2016: Sporting CP

Senior career*
Years	Team	Apps	(Gls)
2013–2020	Sporting CP	114	(28)
2019–2020	→ AD Fundão (loan)	19	(4)
2020–2023	Mouvaux Lille		
2023–2025	Piast Gliwice	71	(49)
2025	Napoli Futsal	4	(0)
2025–	Rekord Bielsko-Biała	20	(7)

International career
2017	Portugal U21	2	(3)
2017	Portugal	5	(0)
- * Club domestic league appearances and goals as of 19:46, 8 June 2026 (UTC)

Edgar Ramos Mendes Varela (born 2 March 1996) is a Portuguese futsal player who plays as a winger for Polish club Rekord Bielsko-Biała.

== Honours ==
Sporting CP

- Campeonato Nacional da I Divisão de Futsal: 2013–14, 2015–16, 2016–17, 2017–18
- Taça de Portugal de Futsal: 2015–16, 2017–18, 2018–19
- Supertaça de Futsal: 2014, 2017, 2018, 2019
- UEFA Futsal Champions League: 2018–19

Piast Gliwice

- Ekstraklasa: 2024–25
- Polish Cup: 2024–25
