= Kioene Arena =

Indoor sports arena in Padua, Italy

Coordinates: 45.4180°N 11.9226°E

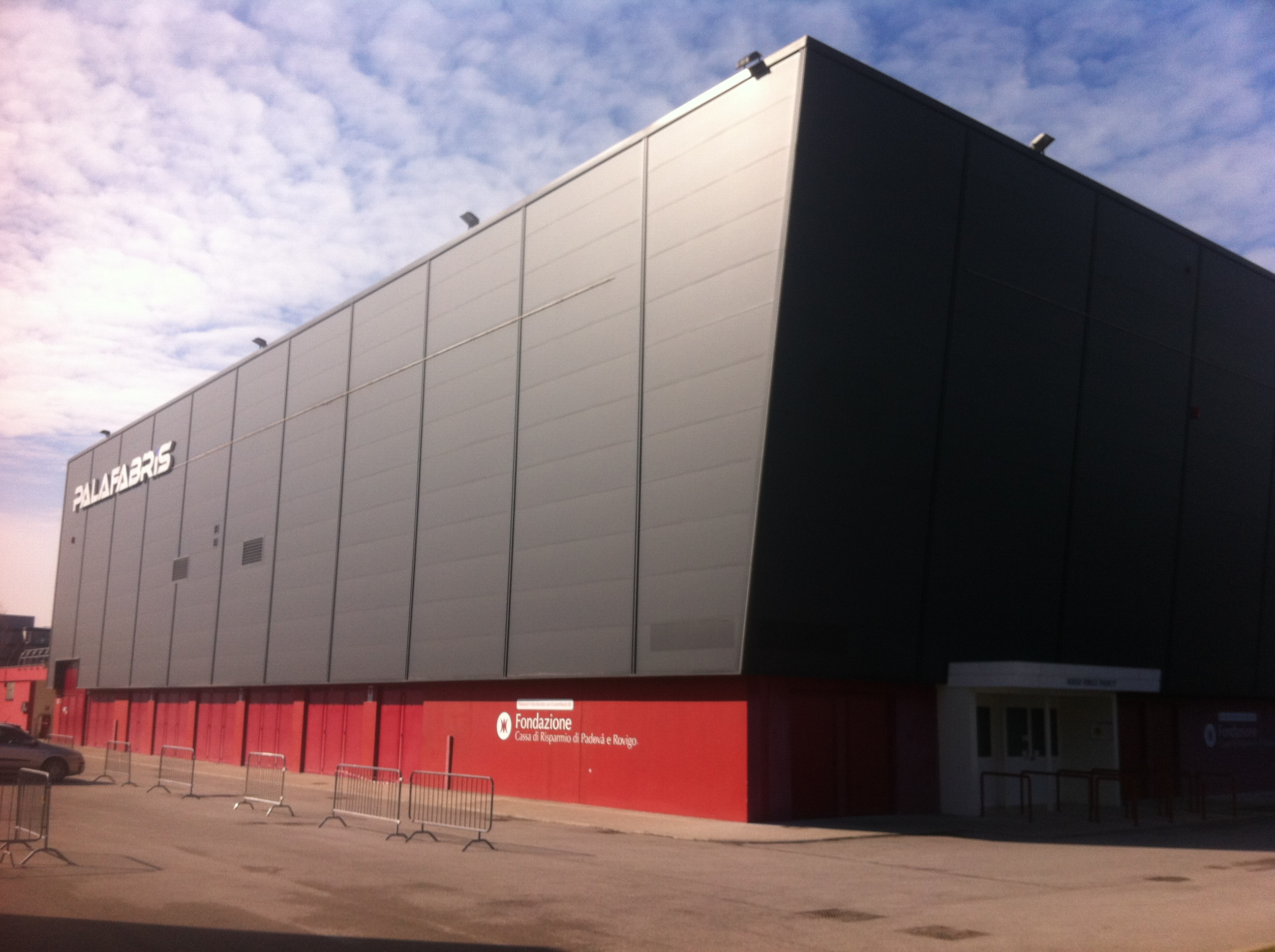
- Former names: Palasport San Lazzaro (1981-2005); PalaBernhardsson (2005-09); PalaNet (2009-10); PalaFabris (2010-15)
- Address: Via S. Marco, 53 - Quartiere 3 Est - 35129 Padua, Italy
- Capacity: Volleyball: 3,916
- Surface: 45,000 m^{2}

Construction
- Opened: 24 February 1980

Tenant
- Pallavolo Padova (1987-present)

Kioene Arena (formerly known as Palasport San Lazzaro, PalaBernhardsson, PalaNet and PalaFabris) is an indoor sports arena located in Padua, Italy. The arena has a seating capacity of 3,916 for volleyball and is primarily used for basketball, futsal and handball. It also hosts live concerts.

The Forum is the home floor of the professional volleyball team Pallavolo Padova.

== History ==
The arena opened in 1981. Since then, it has hosted several important sports and musical events. Among them, the 1981–82 FIBA Korać Cup final, 2007–08 UEFA Futsal Cup and 2011–12 UEFA Futsal Cup.

List of musical artists who played at the PalaFabris
- Michael Bolton
- Tokio Hotel
- Bob Dylan
- Violetta (28 and 29 February 2014)
- Soy Luna (6 February 2018)
- Avril Lavigne (23 April 2023)

Preceded by Palau Blaugrana; Barcelona	FIBA Korać Cup; Final; 1982	Succeeded by Deutschlandhalle; Berlin
