= 2016 Nordic Futsal Championship =

Nordic Futsal Championship 2016

Tournament details
- Host country: Sweden
- City: Gothenburg
- Dates: 5–7 August 2016
- Teams: 6 (from 1 confederation)
- Venue(s): 1

Final positions
- Champions: (Norway) Sandefjord (1st title)
- Runners-up: (Finland) Golden Futsal Team
- Third place: (Sweden) IFK Göteborg Futsal
- Fourth place: (Denmark) Köbenhavn Futsal

Tournament statistics
- Matches played: 9
- Goals scored: 49 (5.44 per match)

The 2016 Nordic Futsal Championship, was the sixth edition of the Nordic Futsal Championship hosted by Gothenburg, Sweden.

== Final standings ==
Team	Pld	W	D	L	GF	GA	GD	Pts
(Norway) Sandefjord	3	2	1	0	12	6	+6	7
(Finland) Golden Futsal Team	3	2	0	1	13	5	+8	6
(Sweden) IFK Göteborg Futsal	3	1	1	1	7	7	0	4
(Denmark) Köbenhavn Futsal	3	0	3	0	6	6	0	3
(Sweden) Örebro	3	0	2	1	7	12	−5	2
(Denmark) Lysttrup Futsal	3	0	1	2	4	13	−9	1

== Matches and results ==
5 August 2016	Örebro (Sweden)	2 – 2	(Denmark) Lysttrup Futsal	Gothenburg
18:00				Stadium: Prioritet Serneke Arena

5 August 2016	Köbenhavn Futsal (Denmark)	2 – 2	(Norway) Sandefjord	Gothenburg
18:00				Stadium: Prioritet Serneke Arena

5 August 2016	Golden Futsal Team (Finland)	6 – 0	(Sweden) IFK Göteborg Futsal	Gothenburg
20:00				Stadium: Prioritet Serneke Arena

6 August 2016	Sandefjord (Norway)	7 – 2	(Sweden) Örebro	Gothenburg
10:00				Stadium: Prioritet Serneke Arena

6 August 2016	IFK Göteborg Futsal (Sweden)	1 – 1	(Denmark) Köbenhavn Futsal	Gothenburg
12:00				Stadium: Prioritet Serneke Arena

6 August 2016	Lysttrup Futsal (Denmark)	2 – 5	(Finland) Golden Futsal Team	Gothenburg
14:00				Stadium: Prioritet Serneke Arena

7 August 2016	Golden Futsal Team (Finland)	2 – 3	(Norway) Sandefjord	Gothenburg
10:00				Stadium: Prioritet Serneke Arena

7 August 2016	Örebro (Sweden)	3 – 3	(Denmark) Köbenhavn Futsal	Gothenburg
12:00				Stadium: Prioritet Serneke Arena

7 August 2016	IFK Göteborg Futsal (Sweden)	6 – 0	(Denmark) Lysttrup Futsal	Gothenburg
14:00				Stadium: Prioritet Serneke Arena

== Awards ==
Nordic Futsal Championship
2016 champions

Sandefjord
First title

- Winner: (Norway) Sandefjord
- Runners-up: (Finland) Golden Futsal Team
- Third-Place: (Sweden) IFK Göteborg Futsal
- Top scorer:
- Best Player:
