= Stockholm Futsal Club =

Futsal club in Sweden

Stockholm Futsal Club, or in short 1SFC, was the first futsal club in Sweden. It was founded 3 December 2005 by Ove Holmberg but then under the name of Ulricehamn Futsal Club. In 2007 the club changed its name to Stockholm Futsal Club, still as the first futsal club in Sweden. 1SFC was renowned for being a pioneer in futsal in Sweden, fighting for futsal rights in the football society. 1SFC arranged many futsal courses and were the co-founder of the Nordic Futsal Championship. In 2018 the club ended due to bad possibilities to train.
