= Tampere Exhibition and Sports Centre =

Indoor arena in Tampere, Finland

- TESC
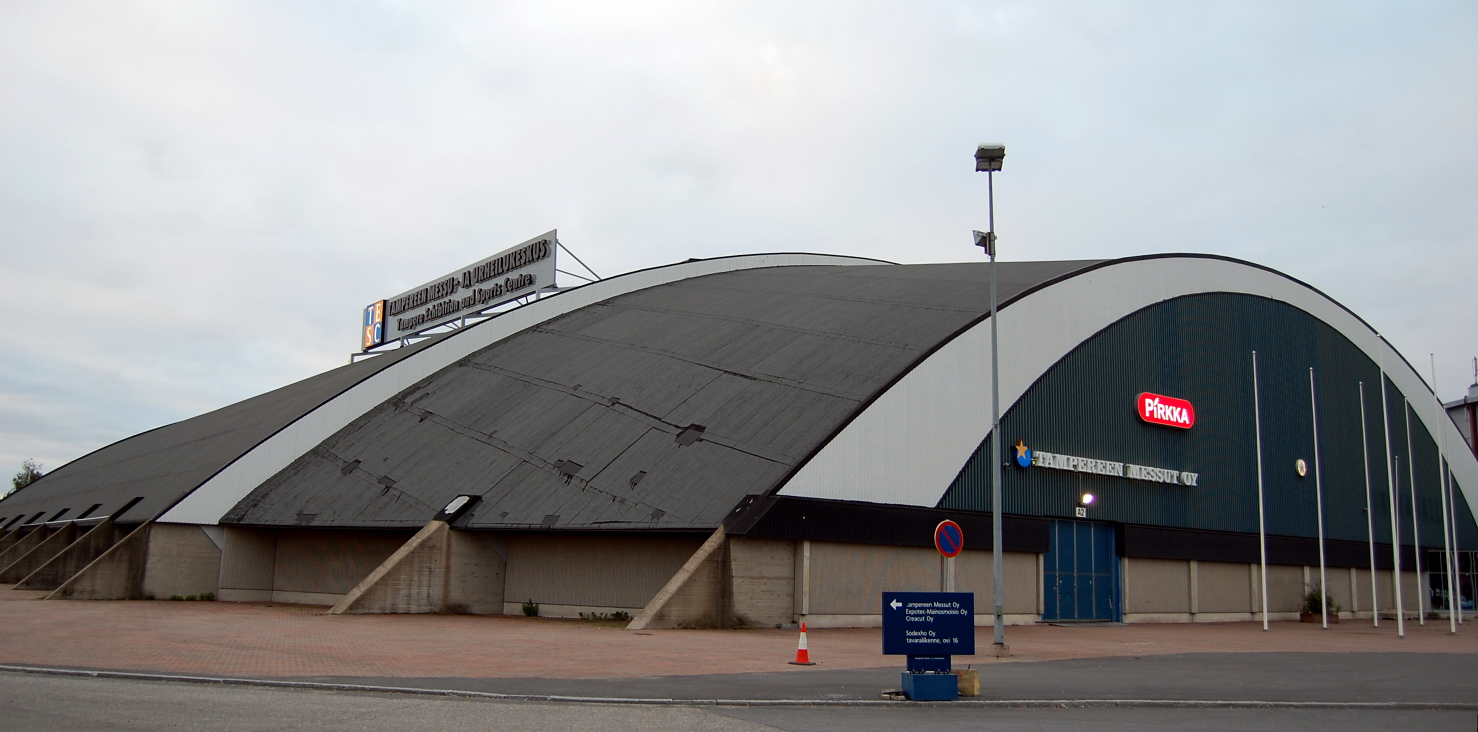
- Interactive map of Tampere Exhibition and Sports Centre
- Location: Tampere, Finland
- Coordinates: 61°27′50″N 023°43′59″E
- Owner: Tampere Fair and Sports Centre Ltd
- Capacity: Hall A: 10,800; Hall B: 1,000; Hall C: 4,000; Hall D: 2,200

Construction
- Opened: 1985

Website
- www.tesc.fi

Tampere Exhibition and Sports Centre (Finnish: Tampereen Messu- ja Urheilukeskus) is an indoor venue in Tampere, Finland. It hosted European Wrestling Championships in 2008.

The centre has 4 halls and the first one was built in 1985.

== See also ==
- List of indoor arenas in Finland
- List of indoor arenas in Nordic countries
- Nokia Arena (Tampere)

Preceded by Winter Sports Palace; Sofia	European Wrestling Championships; Venue; 2008	Succeeded by Utenos pramogų arena Vilnius
