= Slovak Futsal Extraliga =

- Founded: 1993
- Country: Slovakia
- Confederation: UEFA
- Number of clubs: 10
- Level on pyramid: 1
- International cup: UEFA Futsal Cup
- Current champions: Slov-Matic FOFO Bratislava (2011–12)
- Website: www.futsalslovakia.sk
- Current: 2012-13 season

Extraliga is the premier futsal league in Slovakia. It was founded in 1993. Organized by Slovak Football Association and is played under UEFA and FIFA rules, it currently consists of 6 teams.

== Teams ==
Team	City
4FSC FTVS UK Bratislava	Bratislava
Futsal Team Levice	Levice
FUTSAL KLUB Lucenec	Lučenec
MSK Nove Zamky	Nové Zámky
Pinerola Bratislava	Bratislava
Podpor Pohyb Kosice	Košice
Cassovia Futsal Team Kosice	Košice
MIBA Banska Bystrica	Banská Bystrica

Note: The teams shown are of the 2026-27 season.

== Champions ==
Season	Winner
1993-94	Lumas Nitra
1994-95	TTR Kosice
1995-96	Lumas Nitra
1996-97	Lumas Nitra
1997-98	TTR Kosice
1998-99	Diamont Selce
1999-00	Dubnica
2000-01	Dubnica
2001-02	Dubnica
2002-03	Dubnica

Season	Winner
2003-04	Incar Nitra
2004-05	Slov-matic
2005-06	Slov-matic
2006-07	Slov-matic
2007-08	Slov-matic
2008-09	RCS Košice
2009/10	Slov-matic
2010/11	Slov-matic
2013-14	Slovan Bratislava
2014-15	Slovan Bratislava
