= Jordi Torras =

Spanish futsal player

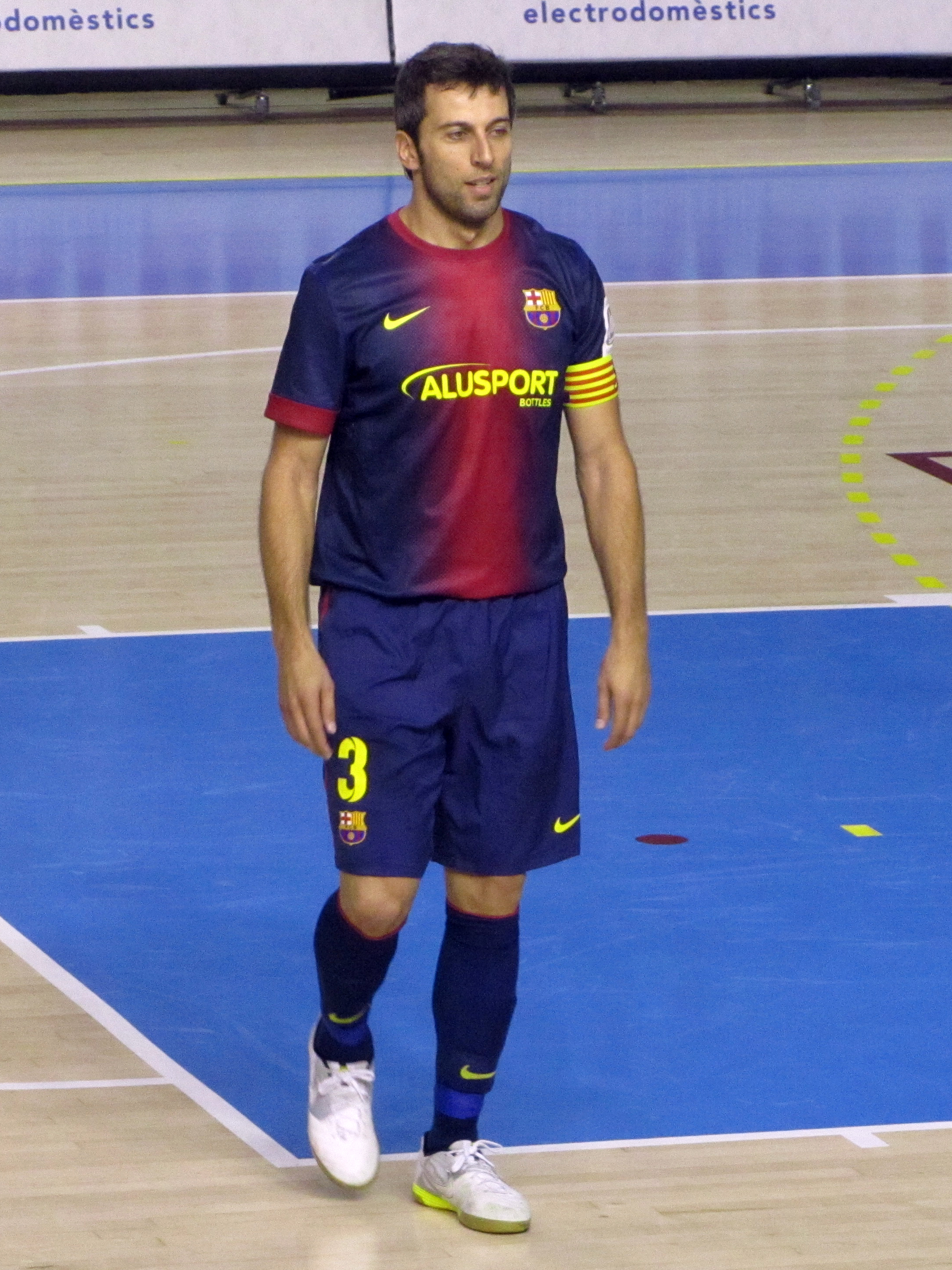

Personal information
- Full name: Jordi Torras Badosa
- Date of birth: 24 September 1980 (age 46)
- Place of birth: Sant Vicenç dels Horts, Spain
- Height: 1.83 m (6 ft 0 in)
- Positions: Ala; Cierre

Senior career*
Years	Team	Apps	(Gls)
1996–2003	Barcelona	58	(70)
2003–2004	Miró Martorell	31	(29)
2004–2007	PW Cartagena	102	(49)
2007–2010	Inter Movistar	101	(54)
2010–2014	Barcelona	129	(71)
2014–2015	Asti	15	(10)

International career
2000–2015	Spain	135	
- * Club domestic league appearances and goals as of 21 February 2015

Jordi Torras Badosa (born 24 September 1980), commonly known as Torras, is a Spanish futsal player.

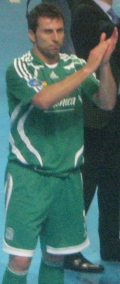
Torras playing for Inter Movistar

== Honours ==
=== Club ===
- 4 Spanish League (2007–08, 2010–11, 2011–12, 2012–13)
- 3 Supercopa de España (2007, 2009, 2013)
- 4 Copa de España (2009, 2011, 2012, 2013)
- 4 Copa del Rey (2011, 2012, 2013, 2014)
- 3 UEFA Futsal Cup (2009, 2012, 2014)
- 1 Intercontinental Cup (2008)
- 1 Recopa de Europa (2008)

=== National team ===
- 1 FIFA Futsal World Cup (2004)
- 1 FIFA Futsal World Cup runner-up (2008)
- 4 UEFA Futsal Championship (2005, 2007, 2010, 2012)

=== Individual ===
- 1 Best Ala-cierre LNFS (08/09)
