= Futsal-Liiga =

- Founded: 1998
- Country: Finland
- Confederation: UEFA
- Number of clubs: 12
- Level on pyramid: 1
- Relegation to: Futsal-Ykkönen
- International cup: UEFA Futsal Cup
- Current champions: Kampuksen Dynamo (2018–19)
- Most championships: Ilves FS
- Website: palloliitto.fi/futsal
- Current: Current Season at UEFA.com

The Futsal-Liiga is the premier futsal league in Finland. It was established in 1998.

== Winners ==
Season	Champion	Runner up	Third place
1998–99	FTK	KaDy	Ponnistajat
1999–2000	IFK Willmanstrand	FTK	FC Honka
2000–01	FTK	FC Gepardi	DPR
2001–02	FTK	Ilves FS	FC Honka
2002–03	GFT	FTK	Tervarit
2003–04	Ilves FS	TPK	Tervarit
2004–05	Ilves FS	Ruutupaidat	VALO
2005–06	Mad Max	Ilves FS	TPK
2006–07	Ilves FS	GFT	Ruutupaidat
2007–08	GFT	PoPa	TPK
2008–09	GFT	Ilves FS	PoPa
2009–10	Ilves FS	GFT	TPK
2010–11	Ilves FS	KaDy	GFT
2011–12	Ilves FS	KaDy	Tervarit
2012–13	Ilves FS	GFT	KaDy
2013–14	Ilves FS	Tervarit	Sievi Futsal
2014–15	Sievi Futsal	KaDy	Ilves FS
2015–16	Sievi Futsal	Ilves FS	SoVo
2016-17	Sievi FS	KaDy	Leijona Futsal
2017–18	KaDy	Leijona Futsal	Ilves FS
2018–19	KaDy	Leijona Futsal	SoVo
2019–20	cancelled due to the COVID-19 pandemic		
2020–21	FC Kemi	ToPV	KaDy
2021–22	FC Kemi	KaDy	Akaa Futsal
2022–23	FC Kemi	KaDy	GFT
2023–24	Akaa Futsal	FC Kemi	Mad Max
2024–25	Akaa Futsal	FC Kemi	Mad Max
2025–26	Mad Max	Akaa Futsal	FC Kemi
