= Nørrebrohallen =

Danish sports complex

Coordinates: 55.7000°N 12.5436°E

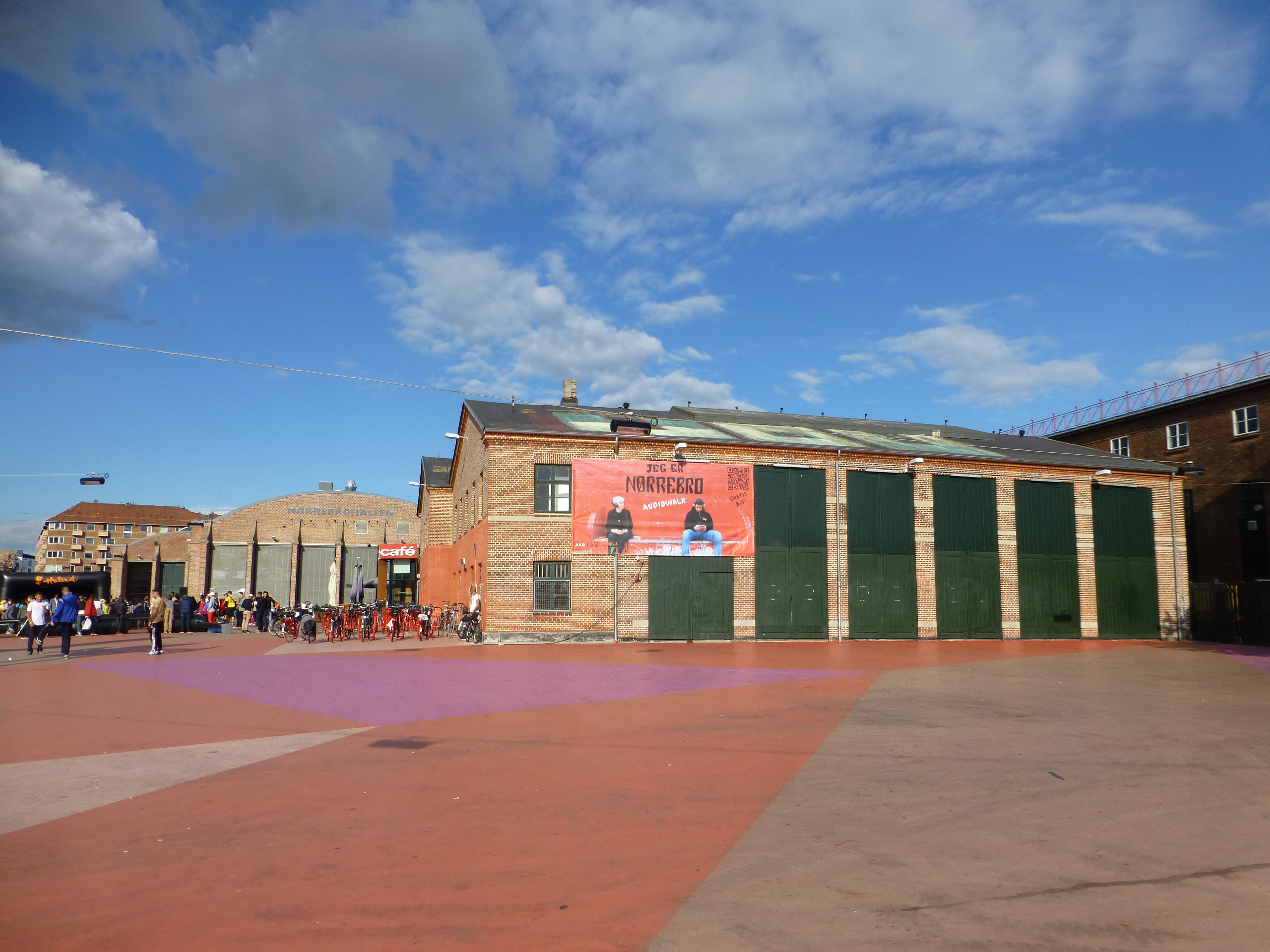
Outside view of Nørrebrohallen.

Nørrebrohallen (English: the hall of Nørrebro) is a Danish sports complex in Nørrebro, Copenhagen. It was formerly known as Nørrebro Remise (English: Nørrebro Depot) because it worked as a depot for the now-defunct Copenhagen Tram until 1972 when all tram activities stopped. The facility is owned and run by the Copenhagen Municipality. The oldest part of the facility was drawn by architect Thorvald Sørensen and was constructed by Siemens & Halske-Bahnabteilung in 1896. Nørrebrohallen was expanded several times since; amongst others by Vilhelm Friederichsen from 1900 to 1902. Furthermore, the professional Danish Basketball club Stevnsgade Basketball play their home matches in Hal 3 in Nørrebrohallen. Hal 3 has a capacity of approx. 600 people.
