= Ekstraklasa (futsal) =

Futsal Ekstraklasa
- Organising body: Futsal Ekstraklasa Sp. z o.o.
- Founded: 6 November 1994; 31 years ago
- Country: Poland
- Confederation: UEFA
- Divisions: 1
- Number of clubs: 16
- Level on pyramid: 1
- Relegation to: I liga
- Domestic cup(s): Polish Cup; Polish Super Cup
- International cup: UEFA Futsal Champions League
- Current champions: Piast Gliwice (3rd title) (2025–26)
- Most championships: Rekord Bielsko-Biała (7 titles)
- Website: futsalekstraklasa.pl

Futsal Ekstraklasa, officially known as Fogo Futsal Ekstraklasa due to its sponsorship by Fogo, is the top men's futsal league in Poland. It was founded on 6 November 1994. Organized by the Futsal Ekstraklasa Sp. z o.o. and is played under UEFA and FIFA rules, the league currently consists of 16 teams.

== Champions ==
Season	Winner
1994–95	P.A. Nova Gliwice
1995–96	P.A. Nova Gliwice
1996–97	Cuprum Polkowice
1997–98	Cuprum Polkowice
1998–99	P.A. Nova Gliwice
1999–00	Clearex Chorzów
2000–01	Clearex Chorzów
2001–02	Clearex Chorzów
2002–03	P.A. Nova Gliwice
2003–04	Baustal Kraków
2004–05	Baustal Kraków
2005–06	Clearex Chorzów
2006–07	Clearex Chorzów
2007–08	P.A. Nova Gliwice
2008–09	Hurtap Łęczyca
2009–10	Akademia FC Pniewy

Season	Winner
2010–11	Akademia FC Pniewy
2011–12	Akademia FC Pniewy
2012–13	Wisła Krakbet Kraków
2013–14	Rekord Bielsko-Biała
2014–15	Wisła Krakbet Kraków
2015–16	Gatta Zduńska Wola
2016–17	Rekord Bielsko-Biała
2017–18	Rekord Bielsko-Biała
2018–19	Rekord Bielsko-Biała
2019–20	Rekord Bielsko-Biała
2020–21	Rekord Bielsko-Biała
2021–22	Piast Gliwice
2022–23	Constract Lubawa
2023–24	Rekord Bielsko-Biała
2024–25	Piast Gliwice
2025–26	Piast Gliwice
