= Palace of Culture and Sports =

Indoor arena in Varna, Bulgaria

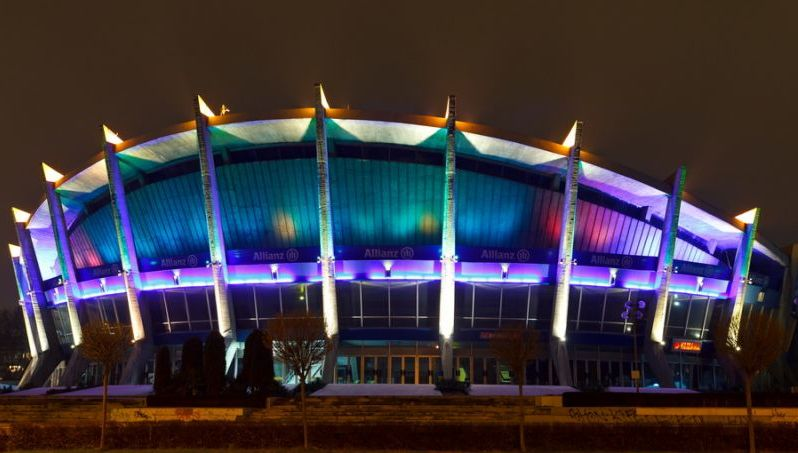
- Interactive map of Palace of Culture and Sports
- Location: Varna, Bulgaria
- Coordinates: 43.210854°N 27.931751°E
- Owner: City of Varna
- Capacity: Kongresna Hall: 6,000; Mladost Hall: 1,800; Hall 20: 450

Construction
- Groundbreaking: 28 October 1966
- Opened: 17 September 1968
- Renovated: 1986–87, 2014–15
- Architect: Stefan Kolchev

Tenants
- Cherno More Ticha; Bulgaria national volleyball team

Palace of Culture and Sports (Bulgarian: Дворец на културата и спорта) is an indoor complex for culture and sport located in Varna, Bulgaria. The complex has three sports halls - "Kongresna Hall", "Mladost Hall" and "Hall 20". The Palace of Culture and Sports was completed in 1968.

A complete copy of the "Palace of Culture and Sports" exists in Africa - this is the "National Arts Theatre", Iganmu, in Lagos, Nigeria. The building was designed by the same architect - Stefan Kolchev.

== Kongresna Hall ==
Kongresna Hall is currently home of the Bulgaria national volleyball team and basketball team Cherno More Ticha. The arena holds 6,000 people. The venue was completely renovated in 2015.

== Sport events ==
- 1984: Weightlifting at the Friendship Games
- 1987: XIII World Rhythmic Gymnastics Championships
- 2008: WAKO European Championships
- 2012: SUPERKOMBAT World Grand Prix III
- 2018: FIVB Volleyball World Championship
- 2021: 2021 Rhythmic Gymnastics European Championships
- 2023: 2023 Men's European Volleyball Championship
- 2026: 2026 Rhythmic Gymnastics European Championships

== See also ==
- List of indoor arenas in Bulgaria
