= Akademia FC Pniewy =

Polish futsal club

- Full name: Akademia Futsal Club Pniewy
- Nickname(s): Akademicy (The Academics)
- Founded: 1999; 26 years ago (as Akademia Słowa Poznań)
- Dissolved: 2012; 13 years ago
- Ground: Pniewy
- Capacity: 420
Home colours

Akademia Futsal Club was a Polish futsal club based in Pniewy.

== Honours ==
- Ekstraklasa
  - Champions: 2009–10, 2010–11, 2011–12
  - Runners-up: 2006–07
  - Third place: 2008–09
- II liga North
  - Champions: 2002–03
- Polish Cup
  - Winners: 2008–09
  - Runners-up: 2007–08
