= Iberia Star =

- Full name: Iberia Star
- Founded: 2000
- Dissolved: 2014
- Ground: Tbilisi, Georgia
- Capacity: unknown
- Manager: (Ukraine) Oleg Solodovnyk
- League: Georgian League
Home colours	Away colours

Iberia Star Tbilisi was a futsal club based in Tbilisi, Georgia, that played in the Georgian Futsal League and the UEFA Futsal Cup.

The club was founded under the designation "Iberia Samtredia", changing it to Iberia 2003 Tbilisi later until on the beginning of 2009-10 season they changed to the latest designation. Up to 2014/15 they were the only team to compete in every edition of the UEFA Futsal Cup. At the end of 2014 the futsal team was disbanded.

== Honours ==
Up to 2014 they have won twelve Georgian Futsal League championships and five cup titles.

- 13 Georgian League: 2002, 2003, 2004, 2005, 2006, 2007, 2008, 2009, 2010, 2011, 2012, 2013, 2014
- 6 Georgian Futsal Cup: 2004, 2005, 2006, 2010, 2011, 2014

== Other teams ==
A women's football team has won the Georgia women's football championship in 2014.
