= Club Futsal Eindhoven =

Dutch futsal club

FC Eindhoven Futsal
- Full name: Club Futsal Eindhoven
- Founded: 1977
- Ground: Eindhoven, Netherlands
- Capacity: unknown
- Manager: Carmelo Nieddu
- League: Topdivisie
- 2009-10: Topdivisie, champion
Home colours	Away colours

FC Eindhoven Futsal is a futsal club based in Eindhoven, Netherlands. The club was founded in 1977.

== Honours ==
- Topdivisie:4 (2009–10, 2010–11, 2011–12, 2012–13)
- Dutch Futsal Cup: 2 (2010, 2012)
- Dutch Super Cup:3 (2011, 2012, 2013)

== Externan link ==
- Official Website
