= Slov-Matic Bratislava =

Slov-Matic
- Full name: Slov-Matic FOFO Bratislava
- Nickname: Oranjes
- Founded: 1984
- Ground: Sportová hala Pasienky, Bratislava
- Capacity: 3500
- Chairman: Ing.Grendár Martin
- Manager: Ján Janík
- League: Extraliga
- 2012/13: 1st
- Website: www.slov-matic-fofo.sk
Home colours	Away colours

Slov-Matic FOFO Bratislava is a futsal club based in Bratislava, Slovakia.

== Current squad ==
Note: Flags indicate national team as defined under FIFA eligibility rules; some limited exceptions apply. Players may hold more than one non-FIFA nationality.

No.	Pos.	Nation	Player
1	GK	SVK	Mário Gašparovič
3		SVK	Dušan Rafaj
4		SVK	Igor Nagy
7		SVK	Tomáš Bagin
8		SVK	Attila Fehérvári
9		SVK	Peter Kozár
10		SVK	Ladislav Mikita
11		SVK	Peter Haľko

No.	Pos.	Nation	Player
13		SVK	Vojtech Várady
14		SVK	Martin Rejžek
15		SVK	Marek Bahna
16		SVK	Gabriel Bartošek
17		SVK	Anton Brunovský
18		SVK	Daniel Mikletič
19	GK	SVK	Peter Brndiar

Official staff

- Head coach: Jan Janik
- Assistant of the coach: Matej Vlašič
- Medical doctor: Igor Blaško
- Physiotherapist: Daniel Klačko
- Sport manager: Martin Grendar junior
- Press and media manager: Vladimir Ambrozek

== Honours ==
=== National ===
- 8 Slovak Futsal Extraliga: 2005, 2006, 2007, 2008, 2010, 2011, 2012, 2013
- 9 Slovak Futsal Cup: 2005, 2006, 2007, 2008, 2009, 2010, 2011, 2012, 2013

== See also ==
- Futsal in Slovakia

== Externan link ==
- Official Website
