= Ilves FS =

- Full name: Ilves FS
- Ground: Kauppi Sport Center, Tampere, Finland
- League: Futsal-Liiga
Home colours

Ilves FS is a futsal club based in Tampere, Finland, part of multi-sport club Ilves. Ilves plays in the Futsal-Liiga, the top-division in Finnish futsal. Ilves is the most successful club in Futsal-Liiga with eight championships (most recent in 2013-2014).

== Honours ==
- Finnish Championship (8): 2004, 2005, 2007, 2010, 2011, 2012, 2013, 2014
- Futsal Cup winner: 2006, 2010, 2011
- Super Cup winner: 2004, 2006, 2007, 2010, 2011

== UEFA Club Competitions Record ==
=== UEFA Futsal Cup ===
Season	Competition	Opponent	Result
2004–2005	Main round	(Belgium) Action 21 Charleroi	0-8
2004–2005	Main round	(Romania) FC Bodu Bucuresti	2-5
2004–2005	Main round	(Lithuania) FK Inkaras Kaunas	4-3
2005–2006	Main round	(Croatia) Orkan VK Zagreb	2-8
2005–2006	Main round	(Ukraine) FC Shaktar Donetsk	0-11
2005–2006	Main round	(Slovakia) Slov-Matic Fofo Bratislava	2-4
2007–2008	Main round	(Czech Republic) FK Era-Pak Chrudim	3-6
2007–2008	Main round	(Serbia) KMF Marbo Beograd	2-3
2007–2008	Main round	(Sweden) Skövde AIK	3-6
2010–2011	Preliminary round	(Albania) KF Tirana	3-1
2010–2011	Preliminary round	(Denmark) BGA Futsal	2-1
2010–2011	Preliminary round	(Malta) ZC Excess Futsal	5-5
2010–2011	Main round	(Croatia) Nacional Zagreb	1-7
2010–2011	Main round	(Italy) Montesilvano	1-6
2010–2011	Main round	(Israel) Asa Tel-Aviv	3-7
2011–2012	Preliminary round	(Germany) Croatia Berlin	8-4
2011–2012	Preliminary round	(Montenegro) Bajo Pivljanin	4-2
2011–2012	Preliminary round	(Scotland) Perth Saltires	3-3
2011–2012	Main round	(Italy) Marca Futsal	0-6
2011–2012	Main round	(Romania) City'US Târgu Mures	1-7
2011–2012	Main round	(Croatia) MNK Split	2-4

== See also ==
- Futsal in Finland
