= 2021–22 Croatian First Futsal League =

Croatian First Futsal League
- Dates: 1 October 2021 – 29 May 2022
- Champions: Novo Vrijeme
- Relegated: Šibenik 1983; Alumnus Sesvete
- UEFA Futsal Champions League: Novo Vrijeme; Futsal Pula
- Matches played: 90
- Goals scored: 597 (6.63 per match)
- Top goalscorer: Zvonimir Šućur (22) Šibenik 1983
- Biggest home win: Novo Vrijeme 13–2 Alumnus Sesvete
- Biggest away win: Crnica 2–9 Futsal Dinamo
- Highest scoring: Novo Vrijeme 13–2 Alumnus Sesvete
- All statistics correct as of 29 May 2022.

The 2021–22 Croatian First Futsal League (also known as Prva hrvatska malonogometna liga or Prva HMNL) is the 31st season of the Croatian First Futsal League, the national championship for men's futsal teams in Croatia, since its establishment in 1992. The season started on 1 October 2021 with first round od league and ended on 29 May 2022 with fourth game of finals.

== Competition system ==
The competition takes place in two parts.

First part: Double round robin league with ten clubs playing total of 18 rounds. After end of first part top eight teams goes to playoffs while the last one is relegated and ninth goes to promotion/relegation playoff with the winner of three groups of the Second Croatian futsal league.

Second part: Playoffs in which eight best placed clubs play after the first part of the competition. The quarter-finals and semi-finals are played on two won matches, and the finals on three won matches. During the playoffs in the quarter-finals, semi-finals and finals, the better placed club from the first part of the championship retains the right to host in the first, third and eventual fifth game. Playoff match pairs are determined according to the following schedule:

Quarter-finals: 1st against 8th, 2nd against 7th, 3rd against 6th and 4th against 5th;

Semi-finals: winner of quarterfinal match 1 against winner of quarterfinal match 4 and winner of quarterfinal match 2 against winner of quarterfinal of match 3;

Finale: winner of semifinal match 1 against winner of semifinal match 2.

== Teams ==
=== Changes ===
Futsal Pula and Šibenik 1983 were promoted to the Prva HMNL after finishing on top two places in qualifications. Osijek Kelme was relegated finishing last in the Prva HMNL, while Uspinjača was eliminated in qualification.

=== Club locations ===
Team	City	Sport hall
Alumnus Sesvete	Zagreb	Sportska dvorana Jelkovec
Crnica	Šibenik	Sportska dvorana Baldekin
Futsal Dinamo	Zagreb	Dom sportova, hall 2
Futsal Pula	Pula	Dom sportova Mate Parlov
Novo Vrijeme	Makarska	Sportski centar Makarska
Olmissum	Omiš	Sportska dvorana Ribnjak
Square	Dubrovnik	Sportska dvorana Gospino polje
Šibenik 1983	Šibenik	Sportska dvorana Baldekin
Universitas	Split	Sportska centar Gripe
Vrgorac	Vrgorac	Dom sportova Vrgorac

Locations of teams in 2021–22 Prva HMNL

== League table ==
Pos	Team	Pld	W	D	L	GF	GA	GD	Pts	Qualification or relegation
1	Olmissum (X)	18	11	2	5	58	35	+23	35	Advance to the playoffs
2	Futsal Pula (X)	18	9	3	6	60	52	+8	30 (Note: Head-to-head points: Futsal Pula 10 pts, Square 9 pts, Crnica 8 pts, Novo Vrijeme 7 pts)	Advance to the playoffs
3	Square (X)	18	9	3	6	62	47	+15	30	Advance to the playoffs
4	Crnica (X)	18	9	3	6	65	58	+7	30	Advance to the playoffs
5	Novo Vrijeme (X)	18	9	3	6	74	55	+19	30	Advance to the playoffs
6	Futsal Dinamo (X)	18	8	3	7	63	45	+18	27	Advance to the playoffs
7	Universitas (X)	18	6	7	5	54	47	+7	25	Advance to the playoffs
8	Vrgorac (X)	18	7	3	8	58	62	−4	24	Advance to the playoffs
9	Šibenik 1983 (Y)	18	5	5	8	66	82	−16	20	Qualification to Relegation play-offs
10	Alumnus Sesvete (R)	18	1	0	17	37	114	−77	3	Relegation to Croatian Second Futsal League

Updated to match(es) played on 15 April 2022. Source: Prva HMNL (in Croatian)
Rules for classification: 1) Points; 2) Head-to-head points; 3) Head-to-head goal difference; 4) Head-to-head away goals scored; 5) Goal difference; 6) Draw.
(R) Relegated; (X) Qualified to the playoffs; (Y) Qualified to relegation playoffs

== Results ==
Each team plays home-and-away against every other team in the league, for a total of 18 matches each played.

Home \ Away	ALU	CRN	DIN	PUL	NVA	OLM	SQU	ŠIB	UNI	VRG
Alumnus Sesvete	—	1–6	0–4	2–4	4–7	2–7	0–4	2–4	3–5	3–6
Crnica	4–5	—	2–9	6–2	2–5	3–1	1–4	6–2	6–3	6–4
Futsal Dinamo	6–1	1–2	—	3–2	5–2	4–4	2–1	5–1	2–4	4–4
Futsal Pula	6–4	3–3	5–5	—	4–2	4–2	3–2	7–3	1–2	4–3
Novo Vrijeme	13–2	5–5	2–1	2–3	—	5–1	2–1	5–6	3–3	5–3
Olmissum	3–1	4–0	4–0	4–2	2–1	—	5–2	6–2	4–2	3–2
Square	12–2	3–6	4–2	3–2	5–4	1–0	—	3–3	3–2	2–3
Šibenik 1983	9–2	2–6	0–5	2–5	5–5	1–7	3–3	—	4–4	3–3
Universitas	9–2	0–0	3–2	1–1	1–2	0–0	3–3	5–9	—	6–1
Vrgorac	5–1	4–1	4–3	3–2	2–4	3–1	4–6	3–7	1–1	—

Updated to match(es) played on 15 April 2022. Source: Prva HMNL (in Croatian)
Legend: Blue = home team win; Yellow = draw; Red = away team win.

== Playoff ==
Quarter finals
Olmissum	2
Vrgorac	0
Crnica	0
Novo Vrijeme	2
Futsal Pula	2
Universitas	0
Square	2
Futsal Dinamo	1

Semi finals
Olmissum	1
Novo Vrijeme	2
Futsal Pula	2
Square	0

Fianals
Novo Vrijeme	3
Futsal Pula	1

=== Quarter-finals ===
22 April 2022
20:00 CEST

Olmissum	2–1	Vrgorac
Kustura 5'; Sekulić 10'	Report	Jakovljević 4'

Sportska dvorana Ribnjak, Omiš
Attendance: 400
Referee: Edo Vulić, Miloslav Šimac, Goran Duvnjak
30 April 2022
19:00 CEST

Vrgorac	2–3	Olmissum
Martinac 37'; Gašpar 39'	Report	Kustura 3'; Pavić 32'; Jurić 37'

Dom sportova Vrgorac, Vrgorac
Attendance: 400
Referee: Josip Dujmić, Mario Blažin, Goran Duvnjak

Olmissum wins 2–0 overall.

22 April 2022
18:00 CEST

Futsal Pula	6–2	Universitas
Juretić 7' (o.g.); De. Moravac 9' (2pen.); Vukmir 21', 33'; Mataja 32'; Grbić 34'	Report	Gotovac 15', 19' (2pen.)

Dom sportova Mate Parlov, Pula
Attendance: 150
Referee: Mislav Đeko, Boris Stanić, Mario Blažin
30 April 2022
18:30 CEST

Universitas	0–1 (a.e.t.)	Futsal Pula
	Report	Bilić 44' (2pen.)

Sportska centar Gripe, Split
Attendance: 200
Referee: Mateo Šimunov, Ivan Šalinović, Mario Budimir

Futsal Pula wins 2–0 overall.

25 April 2022
18:30 CEST

Square	3–1	Futsal Dinamo
Kuraja 30' (2pen.); Hrkač 33'; Perović 40'	Report	Mudronja 31'

Sportska dvorana Gospino polje, Dubrovnik
Attendance: 700
Referee: Vedran Babić, Zdravko Kuran, Miloslav Šimac
30 April 2022
18:30 CEST

Futsal Dinamo	7–1	Square
Čekol 8'; Kanjuh 13', 22', 24', 28'; Zonjić 30'; Novak 38'	Report	Kuraja 29'

Dom sportova, hall 2, Zagreb
Attendance: 600
Referee: Krešimir Grgurević, Tomislav Katinić, Filip Mijač
3 May 2022
19:00 CEST

Square	5–3	Futsal Dinamo
Duvančić 1'; Kuraja 4', 16'; Gassmann 19'; Perović 38'	Report	Novak 6', 20'; Mužur 8'

Sportska dvorana Gospino polje, Dubrovnik
Attendance: 1,000
Referee: Edo Vulić, Mario Lulić, Mateo Šimunov

Square wins 2–1 overall.

23 April 2022
19:00 CEST

Crnica	3–4	Novo Vrijeme
Repić 4'; Domar 18'; Šamija 40'	Report	Pulinho 6'; Suton 7'; B. Gašpar 25'; Bašković 40'

Sportska dvorana Baldekin, Šibenik
Attendance: 300
Referee: Nikola Jelić, Josip Dujmić, Mario Lulić
29 April 2022
20:30 CEST

Novo Vrijeme	5–1	Crnica
Kazazić 1'; Pulinho 7', 30', 39'; Jelavić 17'	Report	Perić 39'

Sportski centar Makarska, Makarska
Attendance: 400
Referee: Mislav Đeko, Mario Lulić, Marijan Šimatović

Novo Vrijeme wins 2–0 overall.

=== Semi-finals ===
6 May 2022
20:00 CEST

Olmissum	1–2	Novo Vrijeme
Jurlina 5'	Report	Kazazić 21'; Pulinho 24'

Sportska dvorana Ribnjak, Omiš
Attendance: 600
Referee: Nikola Jelić, Vedran Babić, Mario Budimir
13 May 2022
18:15 CEST

Novo Vrijeme	1–3	Olmissum
Jelavić 13'	Report	Dickson 4'; Perišić 30'; Sekulić 40'

Sportski centar Makarska, Makarska
Attendance: 1,000
Referee: Nikola Jelić, Josip Dujmić, Mario Vecko
17 May 2022
20:00 CEST

Olmissum	1–2	Novo Vrijeme
Kustura 14'	Report	Pulinho 20'; Suton 24'

Sportska dvorana Ribnjak, Omiš
Attendance: 800
Referee: Nikola Jelić, Josip Dujmić, Goran Duvnjak

Novo Vrijeme wins 2–1 overall.

6 May 2022
18:15 CEST

Futsal Pula	3–0	Square
Mataja 8', 40'; Hrkač 22' (o.g.)	Report

Dom sportova Mate Parlov, Pula
Attendance: 300
Referee: Krešimir Grgurević, Boris Stanić, Josip Dujmić
13 May 2022
20:00 CEST

Square	3–4	Futsal Pula
Duvančić 3', 40'; Hrkač 37'	Report	De. Moravac 4'; Luketin 14'; Mataja 18'; Baisel 26'

Sportska dvorana Gospino polje, Dubrovnik
Attendance: 500
Referee: Mario Lulić, Mateo Šimunov, Marijan Šimatović

Futsal Pula wins 2–0 overall.

=== Final ===
20 May 2022
20:00 CEST

Futsal Pula	1–2	Novo Vrijeme
Lolić 4'	Report	Kazazić 19'; Musinov 27'

Dom sportova Mate Parlov, Pula
Attendance: 300
Referee: Mislav Đeko, Dino Kramar, Josip Dujmić
22 May 2022
20:00 CEST

Futsal Pula	6–1	Novo Vrijeme
Šulentić 13', 38'; Bilić 14'; Da. Moravac 33', 38'; Mataja 36'	Report	Pulinho 13'

Dom sportova Mate Parlov, Pula
Attendance: 1,500
Referee: Vedran Babić, Mario Lulić, Mateo Šimunov
27 May 2022
20:00 CEST

Novo Vrijeme	4–3	Futsal Pula
Gašpar 5', 15'; Sesar 8'; Jelavić 36'	Report	De. Moravac 23'; Šulentić 34'; Baisel 35'

Sportski centar Makarska, Makarska
Attendance: 800
Referee: Nikola Jelić, Josip Dujmić, Marijan Šimatović
29 May 2022
20:00 CEST

Novo Vrijeme	5–4 (a.e.t.)	Futsal Pula
Suton 14', 20'; Kazazić 21'; Jelavić 40' (2pen.), 47'	Report	Mataja 16'; Da. Moravac 26'; Bilić 27'; Šulentić 29'

Sportski centar Makarska, Makarska
Attendance: 1,200
Referee: Vedran Babić, Mislav Đeko, Goran Duvnjak

Novo Vrijeme wins 3–1 overall.

== Promotion/relegation playoff ==
=== League table ===
Pos	Team	Pld	W	D	L	GF	GA	GD	Pts	Qualification or relegation
1	Osijek (P)	6	4	1	1	34	25	+9	13	Promotion to Croatian First Futsal League
2	Torcida (P)	6	4	0	2	28	17	+11	12	Promotion to Croatian First Futsal League
3	Šibenik 1983 (R)	6	2	2	2	24	22	+2	8	Relegation to Croatian Second Futsal League
4	Gorica (R)	6	0	1	5	12	34	−22	1	Relegation to Croatian Second Futsal League

Updated to match(es) played on 29 May 2022. Source: Prva HMNL (in Croatian)
Rules for classification: 1) Points; 2) Head-to-head points; 3) Head-to-head goal difference; 4) Head-to-head away goals scored; 5) Goal difference; 6) Draw.
(P) Promoted to Croatian First Futsal League; (R) Relegation to Croatian Second Futsal League

=== Results ===
Each team plays home-and-away against every other team in the league, for a total of 6 matches each played.

Home \ Away	GOR	OSI	ŠIB	TOR
Gorica	—	2–7	2–5	1–6
Osijek	8–4	—	6–6	6–2
Šibenik 1983	1–1	5–6	—	6–3
Torcida	7–2	6–1	4–1	—

Updated to match(es) played on 29 May 2022. Source: Prva HMNL (in Croatian)
Legend: Blue = home team win; Yellow = draw; Red = away team win.

== Statistics ==
=== Top goalscorers ===
Rank	Player	Club	Goals
1	Zvonimir Šućur	Šibenik 1983	22
2	Antonio Sekulić	Olmissum	20
3	Josip Bošković	Vrgorac	19
4	Luka Suton	Novo Vrijeme	18
5	Ivan Gotovac	Universitas	17
5	Marko Kuraja	Square	17
7	Kristian Čekol	Futsal Dinamo	13
7	Toni Jelavić	Novo Vrijeme	13
7	David Mataja	Futsal Pula	13
7	Daniel Moravac	Futsal Pula	13

As of 15 April 2022
