= 2024–25 UEFA Futsal Champions League =

39th edition of top European men's futsal competition

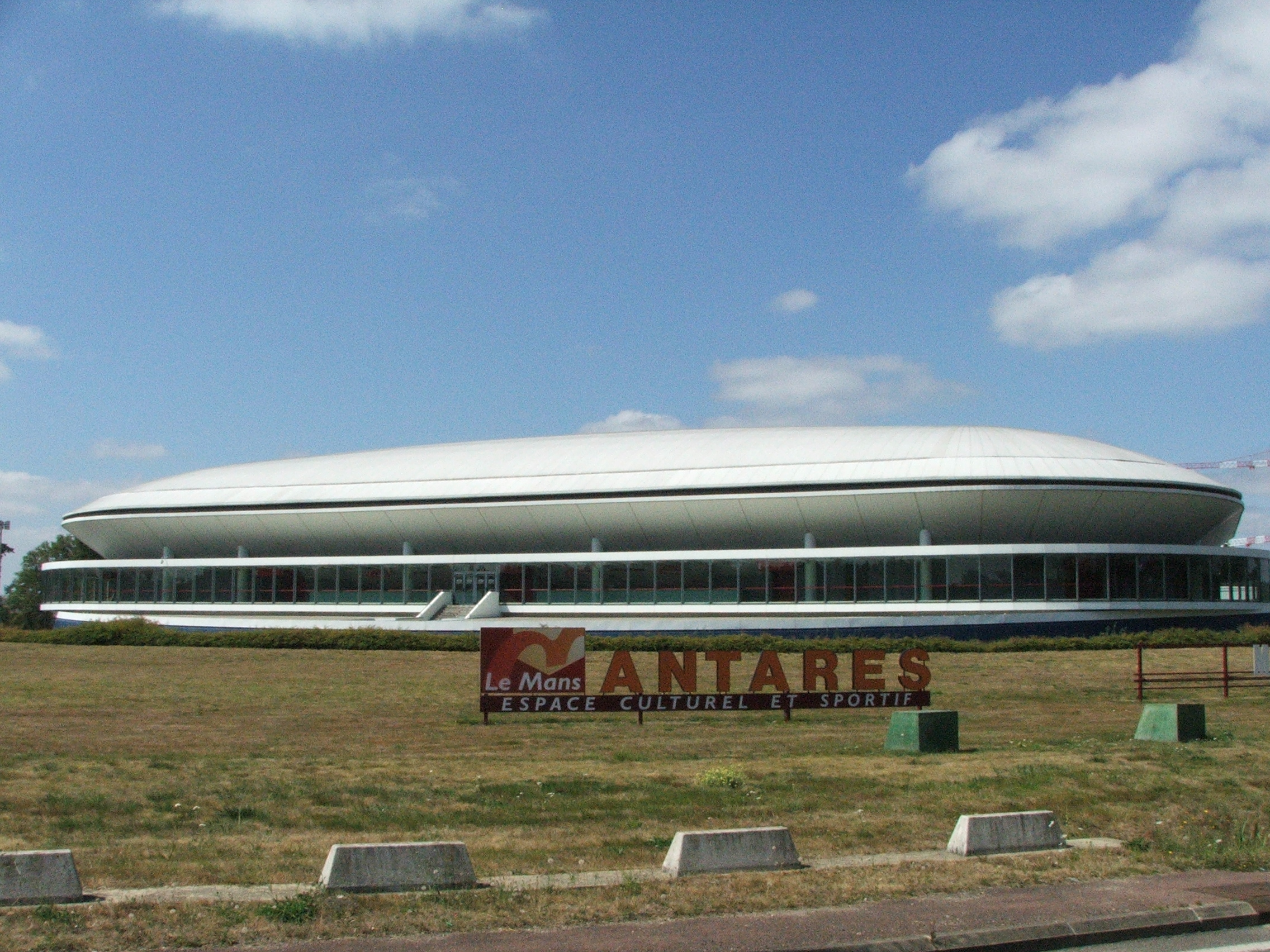
- The Antarès in Le Mans hosted the final.

Tournament details
- Dates: Qualifying rounds: 20 August 2024 – 1 December 2024; Final tournament: 1–4 May 2025
- Teams: Final tournament: 4 Total: 56 (from 52 associations)

Final positions
- Champions: (Spain) Palma Futsal (3rd title)
- Runners-up: (Kazakhstan) Kairat
- Third place: (Spain) Jimbee Cartagena
- Fourth place: (Portugal) Sporting CP

Tournament statistics
- Matches played: 124
- Top scorer(s): Michele Podda (Italy) Catania Calcio (11 goals)

The 2024–25 UEFA Futsal Champions League was the 39th edition of Europe's premier club futsal tournament, and the 24th edition organized by UEFA. It was also the seventh edition since the tournament was rebranded from "UEFA Futsal Cup" to UEFA Futsal Champions League.

Palma Futsal were the title holders. They successfully retained the title.

== Association team allocation ==
A total of 56 teams from 52 of the 55 UEFA member associations will participate in the 2024–25 UEFA Futsal Champions League. The association ranking based on the UEFA futsal national team coefficients was used to determine the number of participating teams for each association:

- The top three-ranked associations have two teams qualify.
- The winners of the 2023–24 UEFA Futsal Champions League qualify automatically and its association can also enter a second team. If the title-holders' association is among the top three-ranked associations, the 4th ranked association is also entitled to enter a second team.
- The remaining associations have one team qualify.

For this season, the top three-ranked associations are Portugal, Russia, and Spain. As the title holders are from Spain, the 4th ranked association, Kazakhstan, can enter two teams. After UEFA's decision to exclude Russian clubs from all UEFA competitions due to the 2022 Russian invasion of Ukraine, the right to enter a second team passed to the 5th ranked association, Croatia.

=== Association ranking ===
The UEFA futsal national team coefficients at the end of April 2023, used to determine the number of teams each association was entitled to enter, was as follows.

Association ranking for 2024–25 UEFA Champions League

Rank	Association	Coeff.	Teams
1	Portugal	2697.016	2
2	Russia	2547.159	0
3	Spain (TH)	2494.422	2
4	Kazakhstan	2344.395	2
5	Croatia	2035.784	2
6	Ukraine	2010.147	1
7	Azerbaijan	1977.359	1
8	Serbia	1945.646	1
9	Georgia	1924.716	1
10	Slovenia	1891.854	1
11	Italy	1877.471	1
12	Poland	1845.059	1
13	Romania	1819.600	1
14	Czech Republic	1815.227	1
15	Finland	1814.563	1
16	Slovakia	1804.533	1
17	France	1759.326	1
18	Netherlands	1740.688	1
19	Armenia	1637.739	1

Rank	Association	Coeff.	Teams
20	Hungary	1635.528	1
21	Bosnia and Herzegovina	1609.649	1
22	Belgium	1568.922	1
23	Belarus	1521.865	1
24	Moldova	1514.719	1
25	North Macedonia	1451.512	1
26	Germany	1442.547	1
27	Latvia	1387.402	1
28	Sweden	1327.701	1
29	Montenegro	1306.735	1
30	Kosovo	1264.444	1
31	England	1204.183	1
32	Denmark	1199.225	1
33	Lithuania	1195.790	1
34	Albania	1177.965	1
35	Norway	1173.463	1
36	Greece	1164.389	1
37	Turkey	1131.406	1

Rank	Association	Coeff.	Teams
38	Israel	1128.385	1
39	Cyprus	1090.591	1
40	Switzerland	1066.246	1
41	Bulgaria	1031.006	1
42	Wales	1011.432	1
43	Andorra	916.855	1
44	Malta	830.007	1
45	Gibraltar	809.650	1
46	Austria	794.108	1
47	Estonia	787.508	1
48	San Marino	762.906	1
49	Scotland	755.050	1
50	Northern Ireland	717.420	1
NR	Iceland	—	1
NR	Luxembourg	—	1
NR	Republic of Ireland	—	1
NR	Faroe Islands	—	DNE
NR	Liechtenstein	—	DNE

Notes

- TH – Additional berth for title holders
- NR – No rank (association national team had been inactive on the previous 36 months)
- DNE – Did not enter

=== Distribution ===
For the 2024–25 UEFA Futsal Champions League, the clubs' entry round was determined by their UEFA futsal club coefficients, which took into account their performance from the previous three seasons.

Access list for 2024–25 UEFA Futsal Champions League
		Teams entering in this round	Teams advancing from previous round
Preliminary round (32 teams)		32 teams ranked 24–55	
Main round	Path A (16 teams)	Title holders; 15 teams ranked 1–11 and 16–19	
Main round	Path B (16 teams)	8 teams ranked 12–15 and 20–23	8 group winners from preliminary round
Elite round (16 teams)			4 group winners from main round path A; 4 group runners-up from main round path A; 4 group third-placed teams from main round path A; 4 group winners from main round path B
Final tournament (4 teams)			4 group winners from elite round

=== Teams ===
Below are the participating teams of the 2024–25 UEFA Futsal Champions League (with their ranking among participating teams), grouped by their starting round and path for the main round.

Main round Path A
Team	Rank
(Spain) Palma Futsal	TH
(Portugal) Sporting CP	1
(Spain) Jimbee Cartagena	2
(Portugal) SC Braga	3
(Belgium) Anderlecht	4
(Kazakhstan) Kairat	5
(Croatia) Olmissum	6
(Slovenia) FK Dobovec	7
(Hungary) Haladás	8
(Czech Republic) SK Interobal Plzeň	9
(Ukraine) HIT Kyiv	10
(Croatia) Futsal Dinamo	11
(Poland) Rekord Bielsko-Biała	16
(Kazakhstan) Futsal Club Semey	17
(Kosovo) FC Prishtina 01	18
(Romania) United Galați	19

Main round Path B
Team	Rank
(Latvia) Riga Futsal Club	12
(France) Étoile Lavalloise	13
(Malta) Luxol St Andrews	14
(Lithuania) Kauno Žalgiris	15
(Belarus) Stalitsa Minsk	20
(Slovakia) MIMEL Lučenec	21
(Serbia) FON Banjica	22
(Luxembourg) Differdange 03	23

Preliminary round
Team	Rank
(Italy) Meta Catania C5	24
(Azerbaijan) Araz Naxçivan	25
(Montenegro) KMF Titograd	26
(Austria) FC Diamant Linz	27
(Bosnia and Herzegovina) MNK Hercegovina	28
(Switzerland) Futsal Minerva	29
(Finland) Akaa Futsal	30
(Netherlands) Tigers Roermond	31
(Armenia) Yerevan FC	32
(Albania) FK Tirana	33
(Georgia (country)) New Vision Georgians	34
(Bulgaria) Amigo Northwest	35
(Denmark) Hjørring Futsal Klub	36
(Republic of Ireland) Blue Magic Dublin	37
(Sweden) Uddevalla Futsal Club	38
(Cyprus) AEL Limassol Futsal	39
(Germany) TSV Weilimdorf	40
(Greece) AEK Futsal	41
(Norway) Utleira	42
(Estonia) Sillamäe Silla FC	43
(Moldova) Clic Chișinău	44
(North Macedonia) Futsal Club Forca	45
(San Marino) FC Fiorentino	46
(England) Manchester Futsal Club	47
(Andorra) Ranger's FC	48
(Scotland) Aberdeen Futsal Academy	49
(Wales) Pro Futsal Cymru	50
(Northern Ireland) Sparta Belfast	51
(Turkey) Istanbul Şişli	52
(Iceland) Ísbjörninn	53
(Gibraltar) Europa FC	54
(Israel) Maccabi Netanya Futsal	55

== Format ==
The tournament has a mini-tournament format consisting of three qualifying rounds and the final tournament. The qualifying rounds consisted of the following stages:

- Preliminary round: 32 teams entering this round were divided into eight groups of four teams with the group winners advancing to the next round.
- Main round:
  - Path A: 16 teams entering this round were divided into four groups of four teams, with the group winners, runners-up, and third-placed teams advancing to the next round.
  - Path B: 8 teams that entered in this round and the 8 teams advancing from the preliminary round were divided into four groups of four teams, with the group winners advancing to the next round.
- Elite round: 16 teams advancing from the main round were divided into four groups of four teams, with the group winners qualifying for the final tournament.

In each group, teams played against each other in a single round-robin format hosted by one of the participating teams.

The final tournament is played at a centralized location and consisted of single-legged semi-finals, a third-place play-off, and final. If scores were level at the end of normal time, extra time was played, followed by a penalty shoot-out if the scores remained tied.

=== Tiebreakers ===
Teams were ranked according to points (3 points for a win, 1 point for a draw, 0 points for a loss). If two or more teams were tied on points, the following tiebreaking criteria were applied, in the order given, to determine the rankings (see Article 14 Equality of points – mini-tournaments, Regulations of the UEFA Futsal Champions League):

1. Points in head-to-head matches among the tied teams;
2. Goal difference in head-to-head matches among the tied teams;
3. Goals scored in head-to-head matches among the tied teams;
4. If more than two teams were tied, and after applying all head-to-head criteria above, a subset of teams are still tied, all head-to-head criteria above were reapplied exclusively to this subset of teams;
5. Goal difference in all group matches;
6. Goals scored in all group matches;
7. Disciplinary points (direct red card = 3 points; double yellow card = 3 points; single yellow card = 1 point);
8. UEFA futsal club coefficients.

If two teams that have the same number of points and have scored and conceded the same number of goals play their last mini-tournament match against each other and are still equal at the end of that match, their final rankings are determined by a penalty shoot-out provided that no other teams within the group have the same number of points on completion of the mini-tournament. This procedure is only necessary if a ranking of the teams is required to determine the team which qualifies for the next stage.

== Schedule ==
The schedule of the competition was as follows (all draws were held at the UEFA headquarters in Nyon, Switzerland).

Schedule for 2024–25 UEFA Futsal Champions League
Phase	Round	Draw	Dates
Qualifying stage	Preliminary round	4 July 2024	20–25 August 2024
Qualifying stage	Main round	4 July 2024	22–27 October 2024
Qualifying stage	Elite round	31 October 2024	26 November–1 December 2024
Final tournament	Semi-finals	TBD	1 May 2025
Final tournament	Third-place play-off & final	TBD	4 May 2025

== Preliminary round ==
The draw for the preliminary round was held on 4 July 2024, 14:00 CET. The preliminary round will be played from 20 to 25 August 2024. The winners of each group progress to the main round Path B.

Times are CEST, as listed by UEFA (local times, if different, are in parentheses).

=== Seeding ===
A total of 32 teams played in the preliminary round. Seeding of teams was based on their 2024 UEFA futsal club coefficients. Eight teams were pre-selected as hosts and were first drawn from a separate pot to their corresponding seeding position. The remaining teams were then drawn from their respective pots to their corresponding seeding position. Teams from Armenia & Azerbaijan could not be drawn into the same group.

Seeding position 1	Seeding position 2	Seeding position 3	Seeding position 4
(Italy) Meta Catania; (Azerbaijan) Araz Naxçivan; (Montenegro) KMF Titograd; (Austria) FC Diamant Linz (H); (Bosnia and Herzegovina) MNK Hercegovina; (Switzerland) Futsal Minerva; (Finland) Akaa Futsal; (Netherlands) Tigers Roermond	(Armenia) Yerevan FC; (Albania) FK Tirana (H); (Georgia (country)) NV Georgians; (Bulgaria) Amigo Northwest (H); (Denmark) Hjørring FK (H); (Republic of Ireland) Blue Magic Dublin; (Sweden) Uddevalla FC (H); (Cyprus) AEL Futsal	(Germany) TSV Weilimdorf; (Greece) AEK Futsal; (Norway) Utleira; (Estonia) Sillamäe Silla FC; (Moldova) Clic Chișinău (H); (North Macedonia) Futsal Club Forca (H); (San Marino) FC Fiorentino; (England) Manchester FC (H)	(Andorra) Ranger's FC; (Scotland) Aberdeen FA; (Wales) Pro Futsal Cymru; (Northern Ireland) Sparta Belfast; (Turkey) Istanbul Şişli; (Iceland) Ísbjörninn; (Gibraltar) Europa FC; (Israel) Maccabi Netanya

Notes

- H – Mini-tournament hosts

=== Group A ===
Pos	Team	Pld	W	D	L	GF	GA	GD	Pts	Qualification
1	(North Macedonia) Futsal Club FORCA (H)	3	3	0	0	21	7	+14	9	Advance to main round
2	(Montenegro) KMF Titograd	3	2	0	1	9	12	−3	6	
3	(Republic of Ireland) Blue Magic FC Dublin	3	1	0	2	9	10	−1	3	
4	(Andorra) Ranger's FC	3	0	0	3	8	18	−10	0	

Source: UEFA
Rules for classification: Tiebreakers
(H) Hosts
21 August 2024
16:30

Titograd (Montenegro)	4–2	(Andorra) Ranger's
Spasojević 19'11"; Marković 19'55", 26'34"; Delić 24'42"	Report	Kalajdžić 11'09" (o.g.); Porcel Alvarez 33'56"

SC Jane Sandanski small hall, Skopje
Referee: Lukáš Peško (Slovakia)
21 August 2024
19:30

Blue Magic Dublin (Republic of Ireland)	2–4	(North Macedonia) FORCA
Lucas 4'20"; Saldanha 20'25"	Report	Ismaili 16'39"; Dandan 26'43", 29'20"; Petrović 38'43"

SC Jane Sandanski small hall, Skopje
Referee: Paavo Komppa (Finland)

22 August 2024
16:30

Blue Magic Dublin (Republic of Ireland)	2–3	(Montenegro) Titograd
Byrne 29'38"; Lucas 37'53"	Report	Tafić 13'30"; Nikolić 31'17"; Marković 38'50"

SC Jane Sandanski, Skopje
Referee: Filip Nešnera (Czechia)
22 August 2024
19:30

FORCA (North Macedonia)	9–3	(Andorra) Ranger's
Leveski 0'30", 8'49", 17'17"; Ismaili 12'07", 32'55", 39'13"; Berrio Hoyos 24'49"; Omerović 26'39"; Isaki 39'34"	Report	Pereira 5'45", 15'27"; Amat 29'57"

SC Jane Sandanski small hall, Skopje
Referee: Zyl Robert Fred Sheriff (Gibraltar)

24 August 2024
16:30

Ranger's (Andorra)	3–5	(Republic of Ireland) Blue Magic Dublin
Sanchez 13'06"; Ferré 16'54"; Garcia Rodriguez 39'25"	Report	Calderon 1'27", 21'07"; Byrne 2'09"; Lucas 14'08" (pen.); Lolich 25'38"

SC Jane Sandanski small hall, Skopje
Referee: Filip Nešnera (Czechia)
24 August 2024
19:30

FORCA (North Macedonia)	8–2	(Montenegro) Titograd
Ismaili 6'26", 30'46", 36'29"; Delić 7'40" (o.g.); Dandan 17'16", 32'03"; Petrović 22'47"; Berrio Hoyos 37'54"	Report	Nikolić 21'58"; Adžić 33'21"

SC Jane Sandanski small hall, Skopje
Referee: Lukáš Peško (Slovakia)

=== Group B ===
Pos	Team	Pld	W	D	L	GF	GA	GD	Pts	Qualification
1	(Switzerland) Futsal Minerva	3	3	0	0	24	3	+21	9	Advance to main round
2	(Bulgaria) Amigo Northwest (H)	3	2	0	1	12	8	+4	6	
3	(San Marino) FC Fiorentino	3	1	0	2	4	18	−14	3	
4	(Wales) Pro Futsal Cymru	3	0	0	3	4	15	−11	0	

Source: UEFA
Rules for classification: Tiebreakers
(H) Hosts
21 August 2024
13:30

Minerva (Switzerland)	5–1	(Wales) Pro Futsal Cymru
Gajser 3'15", 28'40"; Pablo Silva 6'14"; Daniel Machado 15'57"; Halimi 36'07"	Report	Hesp 39'58"

Arena Armeec Sofia, Sofia
Referee: Vasilios Christodoulis (Greece)
21 August 2024
16:30

Fiorentino (San Marino)	1–3	(Bulgaria) Amigo Northwest
Morri 27'56"	Report	Dobrichov 2'45", 17'39", 29'39"

Arena Armeec Sofia, Sofia
Referee: Ali Jabrayilov (Azerbaijan)

22 August 2024
13:30

Fiorentino (San Marino)	0–14	(Switzerland) Minerva
	Report	Halimi 1'28", 30'08" (pen.); Everton 6'16", 8'01"; Luis Fernando 9'58", 11'57"; Vítor Hugo 13'38" (pen.); Daniel Machado 17'21"; Leo Costamanha 19'13", 19'50"; Kägi 32'07"; Gajser 34'39", 36'00" (pen.), 38'49" (pen.)

Arena Armeec Sofia, Sofia
Referee: Srđan Mihajlović (Serbia)
22 August 2024
16:30

Amigo Northwest (Bulgaria)	7–2	(Wales) Pro Futsal Cymru
Kefa 10'02", 29'55"; Baharov 11'31", 16'11", 36'37"; Stoykov 13'55"; Stepanov 23'22"	Report	Dobson 29'00" (pen.); Doherty 39'06"

Arena Armeec Sofia, Sofia
Referee: Maximilian Alkofer (Germany)

24 August 2024
09:00

Pro Futsal Cymru (Wales)	1–3	(San Marino) Fiorentino
Rogers 2'35"	Report	Morri 2'59", 27'31"; Verri 33'48"

Arena Armeec Sofia, Sofia
Referee: Srđan Mihajlović (Serbia)
24 August 2024
11:15

Amigo Northwest (Bulgaria)	2–5	(Switzerland) Minerva
Dobrichov 37'49"; Kefa 39'20"	Report	Halimi 31'05", 36'32", 39'36"; Daniel Machado 34'40"; Vítor Hugo 39'46"

Arena Armeec Sofia, Sofia
Referee: Maximilian Alkofer (Germany)

=== Group C ===
Pos	Team	Pld	W	D	L	GF	GA	GD	Pts	Qualification
1	(Finland) Akaa Futsal	3	2	1	0	16	5	+11	7	Advance to main round
2	(Germany) TSV Weilimdorf	3	2	0	1	12	8	+4	6	
3	(Albania) FK Tirana (H)	3	1	1	1	8	7	+1	4	
4	(Iceland) Ísbjörninn	3	0	0	3	3	19	−16	0	

Source: UEFA
Rules for classification: Tiebreakers
(H) Hosts
21 August 2024
16:00

Akaa (Finland)	9–0	(Iceland) Ísbjörninn
Pirttijoki 2'31", 13'27"; Alamikkotervo 7'47", 32'59"; Vanha 9'11"; J. Intala 13'58", 15'42"; Flethes 15'55"; Pulkkinen 31'09"	Report

Hall Tirana Olimpik Park, Tirana
Referee: Juan Boelen (Belgium)
21 August 2024
19:45

Weilimdorf (Germany)	3–2	(Albania) Tirana
J. Sesar 21'19"; Džindić 26'11"; Gavrić 35'46"	Report	Diar 6'09"; Shq. Brahimi 32'04"

Hall Tirana Olimpik Park, Tirana
Referee: Nicolas Nicolaou (Cyprus)

22 August 2024
16:00

Weilimdorf (Germany)	2–4	(Finland) Akaa
Gavrić 0'18"; Dervishaj 39'13"	Report	Pirttijoki 3'32", 4'36"; J. Intala 7'01"; Pulkkinen 36'08"

Hall Tirana Olimpik Park, Tirana
Referee: Gordon Mccabe (Scotland)
22 August 2024
19:45

Tirana (Albania)	3–1	(Iceland) Ísbjörninn
A. Brahimi 3'46"; Asdren 5'50"; Hafliðason 30'09" (o.g.)	Report	Ricardo Dias 21'48"

Hall Tirana Olimpik Park, Tirana
Referee: Laurentiu Ilie (San Marino)

24 August 2024
16:00

Ísbjörninn (Iceland)	2–7	(Germany) Weilimdorf
Pereira 3'18"; Olguín 29'38"	Report	Džindić 1'55", 7'47"; Kennedy Ribeiro 14'42" (pen.); Gavrić 16'51"; Govorko 22'59"; Ridzal 26'29"; Unai Fernandez 21'05" (o.g.)

Hall Tirana Olimpik Park, Tirana
Referee: Gordon Mccabe (Scotland)
24 August 2024
19:45

Tirana (Albania)	3–3	(Finland) Akaa
Asdren 10'59"; A. Brahimi 15'55"; Ramadani 37'51"	Report	Alamikkotervo 1'18" (pen.); Pirttijoki 6'00"; Savolainen 23'58"

Hall Tirana Olimpik Park, Tirana
Referee: Juan Boelen (Belgium)

=== Group D ===
Pos	Team	Pld	W	D	L	GF	GA	GD	Pts	Qualification
1	(Netherlands) Tigers Roermond	3	3	0	0	13	7	+6	9	Advance to main round
2	(Armenia) Yerevan Futsal Club	3	2	0	1	11	9	+2	6	
3	(England) Manchester Futsal Club	3	1	0	2	10	8	+2	3	
4	(Turkey) Istanbul Şişli SK	3	0	0	3	4	14	−10	0	

Source: UEFA
Rules for classification: Tiebreakers
22 August 2024
17:00

Tigers Roermond (Netherlands)	4–1	(Turkey) Istanbul Şişli
Ramdani 5'02"; M'Rabet-Eloued 5'51"; Mellah 33'04"; Dahmani 37'25"	Report	Ramazan Bildirici 10'22"

The National Cycling Centre, Manchester
Referee: Stephen Vella (Malta)
22 August 2024
19:30

Yerevan (Armenia)	3–2	(England) Manchester
Melikyan 5'28", 21'23"; Patatyan 26'56"	Report	Uriel Araujo (37'50"); Edge 39'05" (pen.)

The National Cycling Centre, Manchester
Referee: Ádám Czene-Joó (Hungary)

23 August 2024
17:00

Yerevan (Armenia)	4–6	(Netherlands) Tigers Roermond
Melikyan 15'35"; Dermenjyan 17'09"; M'Rabet-Eloued 22'43" (o.g.); Mashumyan 36'14"	Report	Dahmani 11'18"; Charraoui 20'16", 31'24"; Tamoukh 30'55"; M'Rabet-Eloued 34'13"; Džurlić 37'00"

The National Cycling Centre, Manchester
Referee: Dino Kramar (Croatia)
23 August 2024
19:30

Manchester (England)	6–2	(Turkey) Istanbul Şişli
Uriel Araujo 3'38", 38'05"; Adubofour 7'02", 38'47"; Uniatowicz 13'08"; Thompson 39'56"	Report	Muhammed Altunay 18'21"; Seydi Akca 33'00"

The National Cycling Centre, Manchester
Referee: Jagnar Jakobson (Estonia)

25 August 2024
12:00

Istanbul Şişli (Turkey)	1–4	(Armenia) Yerevan
Oğuz Ünal 15'13"	Report	Melikyan 15'34"; Sargsyan 25'48"; Yeghiazaryan 31'08"; Mashumyan 32'05"

The National Cycling Centre, Manchester
Referee: Stephen Vella (Malta)
25 August 2024
14:30

Manchester (England)	2–3	(Netherlands) Tigers Roermond
Barnes 20'42"; Thompson 34'45"	Report	Mossaoui 0'40"; Tamoukh 4'50"; Charraoui 34'57"

The National Cycling Centre, Manchester
Referee: Jagnar Jakobson (Estonia)

=== Group E ===
Pos	Team	Pld	W	D	L	GF	GA	GD	Pts	Qualification
1	(Italy) Meta Catania C5	3	3	0	0	19	3	+16	9	Advance to main round
2	(Norway) Utleira Idrettslag	3	2	0	1	9	7	+2	6	
3	(Denmark) Hjørring Futsal Klub (H)	3	1	0	2	16	11	+5	3	
4	(Gibraltar) Europa FC	3	0	0	3	2	25	−23	0	

Source: UEFA
Rules for classification: Tiebreakers
(H) Hosts
21 August 2024
15:00

Catania (Italy)	9–1	(Gibraltar) Europa
Podda 1'00", 6'59", 20'52"; Turmena 3'15", 23'21"; C. Musumeci 5'16"; Gabriel Pina 22'34"; Arillo 27'02"; L. Musumeci 36'44"	Report	Caravante 34'00"

Park Vendia Hallen, Hjorring
Referee: Joern Te Kloeze (Netherlands)
21 August 2024
18:00

Utleira (Norway)	4–3	(Denmark) Hjørring
Rams 2'16" (o.g.); M. Johansen 25'32"; Andreassen 30'14"; Økland 37'38"	Report	Andy Montoya 27'57"; Kasumović 31'25"; Pirata 32'09"

Park Vendia Hallen, Hjorring
Referee: Hakan Tezcan (Turkey)

22 August 2024
15:00

Utleira (Norway)	0–4	(Italy) Catania
	Report	Anderson Zói 3'43", 33'26"; Arillo 8'20", 31'38"

Park Vendia Hallen, Hjorring
Referee: Farik Kečo (Bosnia and Herzegovina)
22 August 2024
18:00

Hjørring (Denmark)	11–1	(Gibraltar) Europa
Knudsen 0'26"; Svaneborg 4'27", 10'01", 23'07", 33'22"; Gantzhorn 13'05"; Kasumović 15'53"; Falck 24'47", 33'56"; Winther 25'14"; Nielsen 37'33"	Report	Caravante 31'18"

Park Vendia Hallen, Hjorring
Referee: Antonios Adamopoulos (Greece)

24 August 2024
15:00

Europa (Gibraltar)	0–5	(Norway) Utleira
	Report	Dønnem 0'48"; Welo 10'47", 27'41"; Stensen 19'54"; M. Johansen 25'31"

Park Vendia Hallen, Hjorring
Referee: Antonios Adamopoulos (Greece)
24 August 2024
18:00

Hjørring (Denmark)	2–6	(Italy) Catania
Svaneborg 16'42"; Anderson Zói 21'50" (o.g.)	Report	Podda 2'44", 20'17", 30'37"; Timm 19'19"; Pulvirenti 23'09"; Arillo 26'35"

Park Vendia Hallen, Hjorring
Referee: Joern Te Kloeze (Netherlands)

=== Group F ===
Pos	Team	Pld	W	D	L	GF	GA	GD	Pts	Qualification
1	(Austria) FC Diamant Linz (H)	3	3	0	0	17	3	+14	9	Advance to main round
2	(Greece) AEK Futsal Club	3	2	0	1	9	8	+1	6	
3	(Cyprus) AEL Limassol FC	3	1	0	2	10	11	−1	3	
4	(Scotland) Aberdeen Futsal Academy	3	0	0	3	2	16	−14	0	

Source: UEFA
Rules for classification: Tiebreakers
(H) Hosts
21 August 2024
16:00

AEL (Cyprus)	4–1	(Scotland) Aberdeen
Skarparis 4'26"; Schlemper 19'20" (pen.); Sokratous 26'03"; Krekos 31'21"	Report	Angus 18'46"

Sporthalle NMS Linz-Kleinmünchen, Linz
Referee: Ingus Puriņš (Latvia)
21 August 2024
18:30

AEK (Greece)	1–3	(Austria) Linz
Rayran Souza 28'37"	Report	Tarnanidis 8'36" (o.g.); Šnofl 28'25"; E. Škrgić 36'43"

Sporthalle NMS Linz-Kleinmünchen, Linz
Referee: Oliver Rodriguez-Ballinger (England)

22 August 2024
16:00

AEK (Greece)	5–4	(Cyprus) AEL
Skarparis 5'12" (o.g.); Tsakanias 11'32" (o.g.); Ntatis 19'31" (pen.); Schlemper 33'43" (o.g.); Rayran Souza 36'08"	Report	Skarparis 8'05", 26'20", 36'57"; Joao Alonso 36'44" (o.g.)

Sporthalle NMS Linz-Kleinmünchen, Linz
Referee: Peter Budáč (Slovakia)
22 August 2024
18:30

Linz (Austria)	9–0	(Scotland) Aberdeen
E. Škrgić 2'15", 7'11"; Milovanović 10'06", 30'39"; Šnofl 19'06"; Bojić 19'40", 25'23"; Idrizi 35'48"; Muminović 39'29"	Report

Sporthalle NMS Linz-Kleinmünchen, Linz
Referee: Dražen Vukčević (Montenegro)

24 August 2024
10:00

Aberdeen (Scotland)	1–3	(Greece) AEK
Campbell 25'41"	Report	Pais 9'00"; Rayran Souza 14'41"; Tarnanidis 34'27"

Sporthalle NMS Linz-Kleinmünchen, Linz
Referee: Ingus Puriņš (Latvia)
24 August 2024
12:30

Linz (Austria)	5–2	(Cyprus) AEL
Milovanović 15'22"; Arnautović 19'45", 37'21"; Muhamedagić 36'32"; Šnofl 37'37"	Report	Skarparis 25'04"; Rialas 39'55"

Sporthalle NMS Linz-Kleinmünchen, Linz
Referee: Peter Budáč (Slovakia)

=== Group G ===
Pos	Team	Pld	W	D	L	GF	GA	GD	Pts	Qualification
1	(Georgia (country)) Georgians Tbilisi	3	3	0	0	16	3	+13	9	Advance to main round
2	(Bosnia and Herzegovina) MNK Hercegovina Široki Brijeg	3	2	0	1	9	8	+1	6	
3	(Moldova) Clic Chișinău (H)	3	1	0	2	5	8	−3	3	
4	(Israel) Maccabi Netanya Futsal	3	0	0	3	3	14	−11	0	

Source: UEFA
Rules for classification: Tiebreakers
(H) Hosts
21 August 2024
13:30

MNK Hercegovina (Bosnia and Herzegovina)	3–0	(Israel) Maccabi Netanya
Ćorluka 3'32"; D. Ivanković 22'10"; Mikulić 29'17"	Report

FMF Futsal Arena, Ciorescu
Referee: Nurlybek Kalimaganbetov (Kazakhstan)
21 August 2024
16:30

Georgians Tbilisi (Georgia (country))	2–0	(Moldova) Clic Chişinău
Roninho 25'23"; Kekelia 38'05"	Report

FMF Futsal Arena, Ciorescu
Referee: Liviu Dumitru Chiţă (Romania)

22 August 2024
13:30

Georgians Tbilisi (Georgia (country))	6–2	(Bosnia and Herzegovina) MNK Hercegovina
Roninho 2'47", 8'39"; Kekelia 5'07"; Jvarashvili 13'29", 30'21"; Gabrichidze 27'12"	Report	Marić 2'10"; Ćorluka 6'04"

FMF Futsal Arena, Ciorescu
Referee: Orest Dutsiak (Ukraine)
22 August 2024
16:30

Clic Chişinău (Moldova)	3–2	(Israel) Maccabi Netanya
Vasilevschi 6'11"; Burdujel 19'03"; Laşcu 32'43"	Report	Taha 5'53", 18'05"

FMF Futsal Arena, Ciorescu
Referee: Andrea Naudi (Malta)

24 August 2024
13:30

Maccabi Netanya (Israel)	1–8	(Georgia (country)) Georgians Tbilisi
Taha 35'43"	Report	Jvarashvili 4'53"; Todua 6'46"; Roninho 7'12"; Khechikashvili 13'17", 19'41"; Gabrichidze 28'22"; Kekelia 31'35"; Italo 38'41"

FMF Futsal Arena, Ciorescu
Referee: Liviu Dumitru Chiţă (Romania)
24 August 2024
16:30

Clic Chişinău (Moldova)	2–4	(Bosnia and Herzegovina) MNK Hercegovina
Obadă 8'09"; Crasnov 31'29"	Report	Ćorluka 2'24", 34'39"; Peko 9'58"; D. Ivanković 33'15"

FMF Futsal Arena, Ciorescu
Referee: Orest Dutsiak (Ukraine)

=== Group H ===
Pos	Team	Pld	W	D	L	GF	GA	GD	Pts	Qualification
1	(Sweden) Uddevalla Futsal Club (H)	3	3	0	0	18	8	+10	9	Advance to main round
2	(Azerbaijan) Araz Naxçivan	3	2	0	1	17	5	+12	6	
3	(Estonia) Sillamäe Silla FC	3	1	0	2	9	22	−13	3	
4	(Northern Ireland) Sparta Belfast	3	0	0	3	8	17	−9	0	

Source: UEFA
Rules for classification: Tiebreakers
(H) Hosts
21 August 2024
15:00

Araz (Azerbaijan)	7–1	(Northern Ireland) Sparta Belfast
Valerio 2'06", 19'33", 20'32"; Manafov 21'01"; Janjić 26'54"; Amadeu 32'18"; Hasanzade 39'16"	Report	Best 34'49"

Agnebergshallen, Uddevalla
Referee: Trayan Enchev (Bulgaria)
21 August 2024
18:00

Sillamäe Silla (Estonia)	3–10	(Sweden) Uddevalla
Gussev 34'04"; Tsõgankov 36'25"; Salas 39'10"	Report	Söderqvist 5'18", 8'07"; Al Mouti 12'15"; Gashi 23'36", 28'44", 34'38"; Herlin 26'32"; Eriksson 32'36"; Zhubi 37'08", 38'04"

Agnebergshallen, Uddevalla
Referee: Paweł Tokarewicz (Poland)

22 August 2024
15:00

Sillamäe Silla (Estonia)	0–7	(Azerbaijan) Araz
	Report	Amadeu 4'54"; Janjić 12'01"; Kadinho 15'54", 25'54"; Manafov 24'39"; Aliyev 32'32"; Aghalizada 34'03"

Agnebergshallen, Uddevalla
Referee: Daniel Stauber (Austria)
22 August 2024
18:00

Uddevalla (Sweden)	4–2	(Northern Ireland) Sparta Belfast
Söderqvist 3'30", 35'33"; Eriksson 14'14"; Hiseni 39'55"	Report	Gibson 11'32"; Wilson Tavares 14'21"

Agnebergshallen, Uddevalla
Referee: Yasin Alageyik (Belgium)

24 August 2024
10:00

Sparta Belfast (Northern Ireland)	5–6	(Estonia) Sillamäe Silla
Männi 1'16"; Gibson 23'17"; Pedro Gomes 31'14", 32'16"; Best 33'19"	Report	Salas 3'41"; Elton Tavares 17'25" (o.g.); Pfening 19'19"; Bažkov 22'06"; Perez 27'56"; Männi 29'29"

Agnebergshallen, Uddevalla
Referee: Daniel Stauber (Austria)
24 August 2024
13:00

Uddevalla (Sweden)	4–3	(Azerbaijan) Araz
Furublad 4'05", 23'05"; Azizi 37'51"; Zhubi 39'18"	Report	Caique Aledes 16'17"; Manafov 36'38"; Amadeu 39'58"

Agnebergshallen, Uddevalla
Referee: Paweł Tokarewicz (Poland)

== Main round ==
The draw for the preliminary round was held on 4 July 2024, 14:00 CET.The main round will be played from 22 to 27 October 2024.

Times are CEST, as listed by UEFA (local times, if different, are in parentheses).

=== Seeding ===
A total of 32 teams played in the main round. They were divided in two paths:

- Path A (16 teams): The title holders and teams ranked 1–11 and 16–19. The top three teams in each group proceed to the elite round.
- Path B (16 teams): Teams ranked 12–15 and 20-23 and 8 teams advancing from the preliminary round. The winners of each group move on to the elite round.

Seeding of teams was based on their 2024 UEFA futsal club coefficients. On Path B, the teams ranked 12th to 15th were in seeding position 1 and those ranked 20th to 23rd in position 2. The remaining preliminary round winners were in a further pot to fill positions 3 and 4.

Eight teams (four in each path) were pre-selected as hosts and were first drawn from a separate pot to their corresponding seeding position. The remaining teams were then drawn from their respective pots to their corresponding seeding position. Teams from Armenia & Azerbaijan could not be drawn into the same group.

Path A
Seeding position 1	Seeding position 2	Seeding position 3	Seeding position 4
(Spain) Palma Futsal (H); (Portugal) Sporting CP; (Spain) Jimbee Cartagena; (Portugal) SC Braga	(Belgium) Anderlecht (H); (Kazakhstan) Kairat (H); (Croatia) Olmissum; (Slovenia) FK Dobovec	(Hungary) Haladás; (Czech Republic) SK Plzeň; (Ukraine) HIT Kyiv; (Croatia) Futsal Dinamo	(Poland) Rekord Bielsko-Biała; (Kazakhstan) Futsal Club Semey; (Kosovo) FC Prishtina 01 (H); (Romania) United Galați

Path B
Seeding position 1	Seeding position 2	Seeding positions 3 and 4	
(Latvia) Riga Futsal Club; (France) Étoile Lavalloise (H); (Malta) Luxol St Andrews; (Lithuania) Kauno Žalgiris	(Belarus) Stalitsa Minsk; (Slovakia) MIMEL Lučenec (H); (Serbia) FON Banjica (H); (Luxembourg) Differdange 03	(North Macedonia) FC FORCA; (Switzerland) Futsal Minerva; (Finland) Akaa Futsal; (Netherlands) Tigers Roermond	(Italy) Catania Calcio A 5 (H); (Austria) FC Diamant Linz; (Georgia (country)) Georgians Tbilisi; (Sweden) Uddevalla FC

Notes

- H – Mini-tournament hosts

=== Group 1 ===
Pos	Team	Pld	W	D	L	GF	GA	GD	Pts	Qualification
1	(Spain) Jimbee Cartagena	3	1	2	0	9	6	+3	5	Advance to elite round
2	(Poland) Rekord Bielsko-Biała	3	1	2	0	6	4	+2	5	Advance to elite round
3	(Belgium) Anderlecht (H)	3	1	1	1	13	9	+4	4	Advance to elite round
4	(Ukraine) HIT Kyiv	3	0	1	2	5	14	−9	1	

Source: UEFA
Rules for classification: Tiebreakers
(H) Hosts
23 October 2024
17:00

Jimbee Cartagena (Spain)	1–1	(Poland) Rekord Bielsko-Biała
Motta 37:26	Report	Ribeiro 20:19

Belleheide Center, Roosdaal
Referee: Ruben António Cardoso Santos (Portugal)
23 October 2024
20:00

HIT Kyiv (Ukraine)	2–8	(Belgium) Anderlecht
Melnyk 7:52; Zhuk 14:32	Report	Gréllo 0:42, 22:58; Rangel 6:08, 28:34, 34:10; Sekulić 6:46; Cainan 14:46, 25:55

Belleheide Center, Roosdaal
Referee: David Schaerli (Switzerland)

24 October 2024
17:00

HIT Kyiv (Ukraine)	1–3	(Spain) Jimbee Cartagena
Gréllo 32:08	Report	Ribeiro 20:38, 26:33, 36:19

Belleheide Center, Roosdaal
Referee: David Schaerli (Switzerland)
24 October 2024
19:00

Anderlecht (Belgium)	1–4	(Poland) Rekord Bielsko-Biała
Abakshyn 31:26	Report	Mouhoudine 15:11; Gil 21:24; Braga 25:33, 30:33

Belleheide Center, Roosdall
Referee: Michael Christofides (Cyprus)

26 October 2024
17:00

Rekord Bielsko-Biała (Poland)	2–2	(Ukraine) MFC HIT Kyiv
Sheremeta 4:25 (o.g.); Panes 25:43	Report	Horpynych 7:24; Siryi 25:18

Belleheide Center, Roosdall
Referee: Michael Christofides (Cyprus)
26 October 2024
19:00

Anderlecht (Belgium)	4–4	(Spain) Jimbee Cartagena
Sekulić 21:23; Cainan 23:06; Braga 29:30 (o.g.); Dillen 33:06	Report	Gon Castejón 12:36; Motta 26:11; Waltinho 26:11; Mellado 28:48

Belleheide Center, Roosdall
Referee: Done Ristovski (North Macedonia)

=== Group 2 ===
Pos	Team	Pld	W	D	L	GF	GA	GD	Pts	Qualification
1	(Portugal) SC Braga	3	2	1	0	11	3	+8	7	Advance to elite round
2	(Croatia) Olmissum	3	1	2	0	10	6	+4	5	Advance to elite round
3	(Czech Republic) SK Plzeň	3	0	2	1	8	11	−3	2	Advance to elite round
4	(Kosovo) FC Prishtina 01 (H)	3	0	1	2	7	16	−9	1	

Source: UEFA
Rules for classification: Tiebreakers
(H) Hosts
23 October 2024
17:00

SC Braga (Portugal)	4–1	(Czech Republic) SK Plzeň
Tiago Brito 1:54; Tiago Sousa 12:23, 30:32; Fábio Cecílio 21:03	Report	Künstner 17:32

Palace of Youth and Sports, Pristina
Referee: David Urdánoz Apezteguía (Spain)
23 October 2024
20:00

Olmissum (Croatia)	6–2	(Kosovo) Prishtina 01
Kustura 1:51, 15:09; Jurlina 7:30, 26:59, 39:59; Đurić 30:35	Report	Rukovci 32:47; Maxharraj 34:27

Palace of Youth Sports, Pristina
Referee: Peter Nurse (England)

24 October 2024
17:00

Olmissum (Croatia)	2–2	(Portugal) SC Braga
Copić 22:29; Petry 27:55	Report	Cunha 23:48; Sousa 28:57

Palace of Youth Sports, Pristina
Referee: Norbert Szilágyi (Hungary)
24 October 2024
20:00

FC Prishtina 01 (Kosovo)	5–5	(Czech Republic) SK Plzeň
Qerimi 3:54; Maxharraj 24:26; Selmanaj 30:06, 39:11; Mazreku 32:17	Report	Knobloch 7:40, 26:25, 31:45; Künstner 24:47; Vnuk 30:16

Palace of Youth Sports, Pristina
Referee: Ivan Ivanov (Bulgarian)

26 October 2024
17:00

SK Plzeň (Czech Republic)	2–2	(Croatia) Olmissum
Knobloch 12:01; Kaká 24:57	Report	Barbarić 31:00; Petry 35:02

Palace of Youth Sports, Pristina
Referee: Peter Nurse (England)
26 October 2024
20:00

FC Prishtina 01 (Kosovo)	0–5	(Portugal) SC Braga
	Report	Cunha 5:43, 26:19; Sousa 27:18; Rosseti 36:16; Gomes 38:52

Palace of Youth Sports, Pristina
Referee: David Urdánoz Apezteguía (Spain)

=== Group 3 ===
Pos	Team	Pld	W	D	L	GF	GA	GD	Pts	Qualification
1	(Spain) Palma Futsal (H)	3	3	0	0	18	2	+16	9	Advance to elite round
2	(Romania) United Galați	3	1	1	1	5	7	−2	4	Advance to elite round
3	(Croatia) Futsal Dinamo	3	0	2	1	5	13	−8	2	Advance to elite round
4	(Slovenia) FK Dobovec	3	0	1	2	4	10	−6	1	

Source: UEFA
Rules for classification: Tiebreakers
(H) Hosts
23 October 2024
16:30

FK Dobovec (Slovenia)	1–3	(Romania) United Galați
Knežević 34:04	Report	Ricardo 2:08, 27:39; Sasse 38:58

Palau Municipal d'Esports Son Moix, Palma de Mallorca
Referee: Miguel Castilho (Portugal)
23 October 2024
19:30

Futsal Dinamo (Croatia)	1–9	(Spain) Palma Futsal
Mateus Maia 25:30 (o.g.)	Report	Marcelo 1:37, 19:59; Piqueras Dolera 5:24, 7:47; Bruno Gomes 8:54 (39:55); Neguinho 20:24; Petreça 29:13, 36:00

Palau Municipal d'Esports Son Moix, Palma de Mallorca
Referee: David Grøndal Nissen (Denmark)

24 October 2024
16:30

Futsal Dinamo (Croatia)	2–2	(Slovenia) FK Dobovec
Mužar 35:00; Gudasić 39:40	Report	Fideršek 22:48; Ruis 23:03

Palau Municipal d'Esports Son Moix, Palma de Mallorca
Referee: Kaloyan Kirilov (Bulgarian)
24 October 2024
19:30

Palma Futsal (Spain)	4–0	(Romania) United Galați
Maia 9:04; Fabinho 27:16, 28:04 (pen.); Muller 30:58	Report

Palau Municipal d'Esports Son Moix, Palma de Mallorca
Referee: Dario Pezzuto (Italy)

26 October 2024
16:30

United Galați (Romania)	2–2	(Croatia) Futsal Dinamo
Sasse 21:04; Cojocaru 39:59	Report	Pasariček 4:59; Čop 15:38

Palau Municipal d'Esports Son Moix, Palma de Mallorca
Referee: Dario Pezzuto (Italy)
26 October 2024
19:30

Palma Futsal (Spain)	5–1	(Slovenia) FK Dobovec
Fabinho 4:02; Rivillos 19:14; Maia 25:34, 33:16; Dolera 24:44	Report	Knežević 16:23

Palau Municipal d'Esports Son Moix, Palma de Mallorca
Referee: David Grøndal Nissen (Denmark)

=== Group 4 ===
Pos	Team	Pld	W	D	L	GF	GA	GD	Pts	Qualification
1	(Kazakhstan) Kairat (H)	3	3	0	0	12	3	+9	9	Advance to elite round
2	(Portugal) Sporting CP	3	2	0	1	10	7	+3	6	Advance to elite round
3	(Kazakhstan) Futsal Club Semey	3	1	0	2	11	12	−1	3	Advance to elite round
4	(Hungary) Haladás	3	0	0	3	1	12	−11	0	

Source: UEFA
Rules for classification: Tiebreakers
(H) Hosts
22 October 2024
18:00

Sporting CP (Portugal)	6–4	(Kazakhstan) Futsal Club Semey
Tatinho 19:51 (pen.); Taynan 22:49, 29:35, 35:04; Pauleta 24:34, 30:42	Report	Torres 03:21; Candido 28:59; Yesenamanov 36:29; Dedezinho 38:54

Baluan Sholak Sports Palace, Almaty
Referee: Aleš Močnik Perič (Slovenia)
22 October 2024
21:00

Haladás (Hungary)	0–4	(Kazakhstan) Kairat
	Report	Alisson 6:39; Edson 9:38; Arrieta 27:07; Cavalcanti 39:36

Baluan Sholak Sports Palace, Almaty
Referee: Bogdan Hanceariuc (Romania)

23 October 2024
18:00

Haladás (Hungary)	0–2	(Portugal) Sporting CP
	Report	Merlim 11:35; Pauleta 35:38

Baulan Sholak Sports Palace, Almaty
Referee: Irmantas Kaprašovas (Lithuania)
23 October 2024
21:00

Kairat (Kazakhstan)	5–1	(Kazakhstan) Futsal Club Semey
Edson 17:49; Dener Rodrigo 22:07; Alisson 35:30; Arrieta 35:55; Otanha 37:48	Report	Daribay 12:55

Baulan Sholak Sports Palace, Almaty
Referee: Darko Boskovic (Switzerland)

25 October 2024
16:00

Futsal Club Semey (Kazakhstan)	6–1	(Hungary) Haladás
Ferrao 1:31, 37:36; Dedezinho 7:27; Yesenamanov 10:20; Torres 35:44; Rodriguinho 36:22	Report	Sipos 13:41

Baulan Sholak Sports Palace, Almaty
Referee: Bogdan Hanceariuc (Romania)
25 October 2024
19:00

Kairat (Kazakhstan)	3–2	(Portugal) Sporting CP
Arrieta 19:51; Alisson 24:37; Cavalcanti 39:42	Report	Taynan 8:57; Guilherme 11:7

Baulan Sholak Sports Palace, Almaty
Referee: Darko Boskovic (Switzerland)

=== Group 5 ===
Pos	Team	Pld	W	D	L	GF	GA	GD	Pts	Qualification
1	(France) Étoile Lavalloise (H)	3	3	0	0	16	5	+11	9	Advance to elite round
2	(Switzerland) Futsal Minerva	3	2	0	1	6	6	0	6	
3	(Belarus) Stalitsa Minsk	3	1	0	2	7	7	0	3	
4	(Sweden) Uddevalla FC	3	0	0	3	4	15	−11	0	

Source: UEFA
Rules for classification: Tiebreakers
(H) Hosts
23 October 2024
17:30

Stalitsa Minsk (Belarus)	3–1	(Sweden) Uddevalla
Yakubov 3:57, 6:41, 16:44	Report	Fazlija 36:23

Espace Mayenne, Laval
Referee: Telmen Undrakh (Norway)
23 October 2024
20:30

Futsal Minerva (Switzerland)	0–4	(France) Étoile Lavalloise
	Report	Guirio 3:28; Napoles 5:04; El Mesrar 31:40, 39:58

Espace Mayenne, Laval
Referee: Viktor Bugenko (Moldova)

24 October 2024
17:30

Futsal Minerva (Switzerland)	2–1	(Belarus) Stalitsa Minsk
Luis Fernando 3:49; Halimi 6:33	Report	Yakubov 15:27

Espace Mayenne, Laval
Referee: Jacob Pawlowski (Germany)
24 October 2024
20:30

Étoile Lavalloise (France)	8–2	(Sweden) Uddevalla FC
Guirio 1:13; Napoles 2:28, 16:52; El Mesrar 21:57, 23:39; Lutin 25:20; A. Mohammed 34:04	Report	Söderqvist 23:00; Al Mouti 25:18

Espace Mayenne, Laval
Referee: Javier Moreno Reina (Spain)

26 October 2024
17:30

Uddevalla FC (Sweden)	1–4	(Switzerland) Futsal Minerva
Azizi 11:43	Report	Costamanha 0:18, 21:15; Halimi 25:20; Silva 27:41

Espace Mayenne, Laval
Referee: Javier Moreno Reina (Spain)
26 October 2024
20:30

Étoile Lavalloise (France)	4–3	(Belarus) Stalitsa Minsk
Napoles 8:21; El Mesrar 22:45, 38:40; Lutin 26:25	Report	Piskum 8:32; Yeromin 32:11; Gorbenko 37:32

Espace Mayenne, Laval
Referee: Viktor Bugenko (North Macedonia)

=== Group 6 ===
Pos	Team	Pld	W	D	L	GF	GA	GD	Pts	Qualification
1	(Latvia) Riga FC	3	3	0	0	13	3	+10	9	Advance to elite round
2	(Serbia) FON Banjica (H)	3	2	0	1	7	8	−1	6	
3	(Netherlands) Tigers Roermond	3	1	0	2	11	10	+1	3	
4	(North Macedonia) FC FORCA	3	0	0	3	5	15	−10	0	

Source: UEFA
Rules for classification: Tiebreakers
(H) Hosts
23 October 2024
18:00

Riga FC (Latvia)	5–1	(North Macedonia) FC FORCA
Serginho 15:22; Strazdiņš 23:08, 32:07; Daniel Airoso 28:19; Vargas 31:33	Report	Berrio 28:35

Sportski Center Voždovac, Belgrade
Attendance: 90
Referee: Marc Birkett (England), Jan Kresta (Czech Republic)
23 October 2024
21:00

Tigers Roermond (Netherlands)	2–4	(Serbia) FON Banjica
Charraoui 29:33; Dahmani 38:01	Report	Krasnić 10:35; Petrov 18:55; Petrašević 31:45; Kocić 35:57

Sportski Center Voždovac, Belgrade
Attendance: 600
Referee: Vlad Nicolae Ciobanu (Romania), Jiri Bergs (Belgium)

24 October 2024
18:00

Tigers Roermond (Netherlands)	1–3	(Latvia) Riga FC
Charraoui 36:33	Report	Vargas 0:27; Thalles 29:49 (pen.); Rafa Félix 39:05

Sportski Center Voždovac, Belgrade
Attendance: 40
Referee: Jiri Bergs (Belgium), Marc Birkett (England)
24 October 2024
21:00

FON Banjica (Serbia)	2–1	(North Macedonia) FC FORCA
Pešić 13:42 (2pen.), 37:00	Report	Krstevski 0:18

Sportski Center Voždovac, Belgrade
Attendance: 550
Referee: Jan Kresta (Czech Republic), Vlad Nicolae Ciobanu (Romania)

26 October 2024
18:00

FC FORCA (North Macedonia)	3–8	(Netherlands) Tigers Roermond
Ismaili 2:38, 9:51; Dandan 36:54	Report	Džurlić 7:07; Tamoukh 8:55, 18:02, 19:29; Charraoui 16:48, pen.; Bouyouzan 26:16; M'Rabet-Eloued 32:48; El Amri 39:23

Sportski Center Voždovac, Belgrade
Attendance: 50
Referee: Vlad Nicolae Ciobanu (Romania), Jiri Bergs (Belgium)
26 October 2024
21:00

FON Banjica (Serbia)	1–5	(Latvia) Riga FC
Matijević 32:10	Report	Vargas 1:37; Serginho 18:47; Thalles 29:48; Claudino 35:18; Vanderson Silva 19:15

Sportski Center Voždovac, Belgrade
Attendance: 1010
Referee: Marc Birkett (England), Jan Kresta (Czech Republic)

=== Group 7 ===
Pos	Team	Pld	W	D	L	GF	GA	GD	Pts	Qualification
1	(Slovakia) MIMEL Lučenec (H)	3	3	0	0	9	4	+5	9	Advance to elite round
2	(Malta) Luxol St Andrews	3	2	0	1	8	5	+3	6	
3	(Finland) Akaa Futsal	3	1	0	2	6	10	−4	3	
4	(Georgia (country)) Georgians Tbilisi	3	0	0	3	2	6	−4	0	

Source: UEFA
Rules for classification: Tiebreakers
(H) Hosts
23 October 2024
16:00

Luxol St Andrews (Malta)	2–1	(Georgia (country)) Georgians Tbilisi
C. Alves 13:27; Maikinho 38:48	Report	Todua 1:57

Športová hala Arena, Lučenec
Referee: Arlind Subashi (Albania)
23 October 2024
19:00

Akaa Futsal (Finland)	2–5	(Slovakia) MIMEL Lučenec
T. Intala 21:22; Pulkkinen 21:48	Report	Washington Luiz 1:10; Romero 6:12, 26:41; T. Intala 10:58 (o.g.); Marcílio 17:37

Športová hala Arena, Lučenec
Referee: Uğur Çakmak (Turkey)

24 October 2024
16:00

Akaa Futsal (Finland)	1–4	(Malta) Luxol St Andrews
T. Intala 27:31	Report	Răducu 22:27; Vevé 26:51; Da Conceicao 31:05, 33:45

Športová hala Arena, Lučenec
Referee: Victor Chaix (France)
24 October 2024
19:00

MIMEL Lučenec (Slovakia)	1–0	(Georgia (country)) Georgians Tbilisi
Marcílio 26:14	Report

Športová hala Arena, Lučenec

26 October 2024
16:00

Georgians Tbilisi (Georgia (country))	1–3	(Finland) Akaa Futsal
Kekelia 27:15	Report	Pirttijoki 0:21, 30:02; Pulkkinen 35:32

Športová hala Arena, Lučenec
Referee: Uğur Çakmak (Turkey)
26 October 2024
19:00

MIMEL Lučenec (Slovakia)	3–2	(Malta) Luxol St Andrews
Belaník 1:46; Marcílio 6:45; Greško 28:09	Report	Alves 8:42; Vitinho 19:18

Športová hala Arena, Lučenec
Referee: Victor Chaix (France)

=== Group 8 ===
Pos	Team	Pld	W	D	L	GF	GA	GD	Pts	Qualification
1	(Italy) Catania Calcio A 5 (H)	3	3	0	0	15	4	+11	9	Advance to elite round
2	(Lithuania) Kauno Žalgiris	3	2	0	1	14	6	+8	6	
3	(Austria) FC Diamant Linz	3	1	0	2	7	14	−7	3	
4	(Luxembourg) Differdange 03	3	0	0	3	2	14	−12	0	

Source: UEFA
Rules for classification: Tiebreakers
(H) Hosts
23 October 2024
17:00

Kauno Žalgiris (Lithuania)	5–0	(Austria) FC Diamant Linz
Wepe 2:05, 9:30; Voskunovič 18:31; Sendžikas 26:19; Alan Jefferson 36:34	Report

PalaCatania, Catania
Referee: Kirill Naishouler (Finland)
23 October 2024
20:30

FC Differdange (Luxembourg)	0–2	(Italy) Catania Calcio A 5
	Report	Pulvirenti 20:51; Bocão 38:18

PalaCatania, Catania
Referee: Stefan Vrijens (Belgium)

24 October 2024
17:00

Differdange 03 (Luxembourg)	0–7	(Lithuania) Kauno Žalgiris
	Report	Voskunovič 11:45; Mantelli 15:00, 21:27, 37:05; Wepe 15:17; Santana 20:32; Jordan 35:47

PalaCatania, Catania
Referee: Raafat Al Hamola (Israel)
24 October 2024
20:30

Catania Calcio A 5 (Italy)	7–2	(Austria) FC Diamant Linz
Luka 10:14; Salamone 14:34; Podda 16:04, 30:39, 32:39; Anderson Zói 17:22; Arillo 23:05	Report	Tornatore 26:52 (o.g.); Milovanović 29:45

PalaCatania, Catania
Referee: Mislav Džeko (Croatia)

26 October 2024
17:00

FC Diamant Linz (Austria)	5–2	(Luxembourg) FC Differdange 03
Škrgić 11:10, 27:21; Pacheco 20:45, o.g.; Milovanović 33:59; Šnofl 36:05	Report	Škrgić 0:19, o.g.; Garrido 39:06

PalaCatania, Catania
Referee: Stefan Vrijens (Belgium)
26 October 2024
20:30

Catania Calcio A 5 (Italy)	6–2	(Lithuania) Kauno Žalgiris
Podda 1:31, 14:13; Arillo 6:11; Turmena 22:52; Luka 34:44, 39:04	Report	Mantelli 9:44; Wepe 15:43

PalaCatania, Catania
Referee: Mislav Džeko (Croatia)

== Elite round ==
The draw for the elite round was held on 31 October 2024, The elite round will be played from 26 November to 1 December 2024.

Times are CET, as listed by UEFA (local times, if different, are in parentheses).

=== Seeding ===
A total of 16 teams played in the elite round. Seeding of teams was based on their results in the previous round:

- Seeding position 1: main round path A group winners.
- Seeding position 2: main round path A runners-up.
- Seeding positions 3 and 4 (drawn from the same pot): main round path A third-placed teams and path B group winners.

Four teams were pre-selected as hosts and were first drawn from a separate pot to their corresponding seeding position. Winners and runners-up from the same main round path A group could not be drawn into the same group.

Seeding position 1	Seeding position 2	Seeding positions 3 and 4	
(Spain) Jimbee Cartagena (H); (Portugal) SC Braga; (Spain) Palma Futsal (H); (Kazakhstan) Kairat	(Poland) Rekord Bielsko-Biała; (Croatia) Olmissum; (Romania) United Galați; (Portugal) Sporting CP (H)	(Belgium) Anderlecht; (Czech Republic) SK Plzeň; (Croatia) Futsal Dinamo (H); (Kazakhstan) Futsal Club Semey	(France) Étoile Lavalloise; (Latvia) Riga FC; (Slovakia) MIMEL Lučenec; (Italy) Catania Calcio A 5

=== Group A ===
Pos	Team	Pld	W	D	L	GF	GA	GD	Pts	Qualification
1	(Spain) Jimbee Cartagena (H)	3	3	0	0	18	3	+15	9	Advance to final tournament
2	(Latvia) Riga FC	3	1	0	2	9	7	+2	3	
3	(Italy) Catania Calcio A 5	3	1	0	2	6	13	−7	3	
4	(Romania) United Galați	3	1	0	2	4	14	−10	3	

Source: UEFA
Rules for classification: Tiebreakers
(H) Hosts
27 November 2024
17:30

United Galați (Romania)	0–6	(Latvia) Riga FC
	Report	Vandeson Silva 5'20", 6'55"; Rafa Félix 14'28"; Daniel Airoso 14'38"; Strazdiņš 21'56"; Guilhermão 27'30"

Palacio de los Deportes, Cartagena
Attendance: 720
Referee: Dejan Veselič (Slovenia), Cédric Pelissier (France)
27 November 2024
20:30

Catania Calcio A 5 (Italy)	1–8	(Spain) Jimbee Cartagena
Podda 8'46"	Report	Pablo Ramirez 1'33", 21'44"; Darío Gil 11'04"; Francisco Cortés 23'44", 29'30" (pen.), 37'02" (pen.); Waltinho 34'02"; Osamanmusa 39'41"

Palacio de los Deportes, Cartagena
Attendance: 3190
Referee: Nikola Jelić (Croatia), Damian Grabowski (Poland)

28 November 2024
17:30

Catania Calcio A 5 (Italy)	2–3	(Romania) United Galați
Turmena 31'48", 38'56"	Report	Sasse 2'49"; Ricardo 15'52" (pen.); Daniel Araujo 21'02"

Palacio de los Deportes, Cartagena
Attendance: 720
Referee: Damian Grabowski (Poland), Dejan Veselič (Slovenia)
28 November 2024
20:30

Jimbee Cartagena (Spain)	4–1	(Latvia) Riga FC
Pablo Ramirez 8'57"; Gon Castejón 15'23"; Motta 16'46" (pen.); Mellado 33'25"	Report	Thalles 6'00"

Palacio de los Deportes, Cartagena
Attendance: 4130
Referee: Cédric Pelissier (France), Nikola Jelić (Croatia)

30 November 2024
17:00

Riga FC (Latvia)	2–3	(Italy) Catania Calcio A 5
Thalles 31'35" (pen.); Claudino 32'16"	Report	Salamone 7'10"; Podda 25'17"; Bocão 25'40"

Palacio de los Deportes, Cartagena
Attendance: 738
Referee: Nikola Jelić (Croatia), Dejan Veselič (Slovenia)
30 November 2024
20:00

Jimbee Cartagena (Spain)	6–1	(Romania) United Galați
Osamanmusa 5'43"; Pablo Ramirez 17'59", 22'28"; Linhares 26'58", 33'58"; Mellado 39'47"	Report

Palacio de los Deportes, Cartagena
Attendance: 4678
Referee: Cédric Pelissier (France), Damian Grabowski (Poland)

=== Group B ===
Pos	Team	Pld	W	D	L	GF	GA	GD	Pts	Qualification
1	(Kazakhstan) Kairat	3	3	0	0	10	3	+7	9	Advance to final tournament
2	(France) Étoile Lavalloise	3	1	1	1	10	11	−1	4	
3	(Croatia) Olmissum	3	0	2	1	5	6	−1	2	
4	(Croatia) Futsal Dinamo (H)	3	0	1	2	5	10	−5	1	

Source: UEFA
Rules for classification: Tiebreakers
(H) Hosts
27 November 2024
17:30

Olmissum (Croatia)	1–1	(Croatia) Futsal Dinamo
Petry 14'47"	Report	Novak 38'31" (pen.)

KC Dražen Petrović, Zagreb
Attendance: 2,000
Referee: Juan José Cordero Gallardo (Spain), Denys Kutsyi (Ukraine)
27 November 2024
20:30

Kairat (Kazakhstan)	4–2	(France) Étoile Lavalloise
Dener Rodrigo 1'18"; Edson 8'05"; Zanotto 31'43"; Arrieta 36'53"	Report	El Mesrar 25'55"; A. Mohammed 36'17"

KC Dražen Petrović, Zagreb
Attendance: 150
Referee: Alejandro Martínez Flores (Spain), Cristiano Santos (Portugal)

28 November 2024
17:30

Olmissum (Croatia)	0–1	(Kazakhstan) Kairat
	Report	Edson (25'13")

KC Dražen Petrović, Zagreb
Attendance: 300
Referee: Denys Kutsyi (Ukraine), Alejandro Martínez Flores (Spain)
28 November 2024
20:30

Futsal Dinamo (Croatia)	3–4	(France) Étoile Lavalloise
Gudasić 3'26"; Guirio 25'15" (o.g.); Prgomet 32'18"	Report	A. Mohammed 8'25", 29'14"; Piplica 14'51" (o.g.); El Mesrar 24'42"

KC Dražen Petrović, Zagreb
Attendance: 2,500
Referee: Cristiano Santos (Portugal), Juan José Cordero Gallardo (Spain)

30 November 2024
17:30

Étoile Lavalloise (France)	4–4	(Croatia) Olmissum
Bakkali 6'38"; El Mesrar 15'47" (pen.)	Report	Kolobarić 2'21"; Žilić 3'14"; Barbarić 18'12"; Jurlina 31'49"

KC Dražen Petrović, Zagreb
Attendance: 250
Referee: Denys Kutsyi (Ukraine), Juan José Cordero Gallardo (Spain)
30 November 2024
20:30

Futsal Dinamo (Croatia)	1–5	(Kazakhstan) Kairat
Dekanić 18'59"	Report	Guegue 19'59"; Prgomet 31'24" (o.g.); Orazov 32'54"; Alisson 36'50"; Zanotto 39'47"

KC Dražen Petrović, Zagreb
Attendance: 1,100
Referee: Alejandro Martínez Flores (Spain), Cristiano Santos (Portugal)

=== Group C ===
Pos	Team	Pld	W	D	L	GF	GA	GD	Pts	Qualification
1	(Portugal) Sporting CP (H)	3	2	1	0	15	7	+8	7	Advance to final tournament
2	(Belgium) Anderlecht	3	2	0	1	10	7	+3	6	
3	(Portugal) SC Braga	3	1	1	1	9	12	−3	4	
4	(Czech Republic) SK Plzeň	3	0	0	3	6	14	−8	0	

Source: UEFA
Rules for classification: Tiebreakers
(H) Hosts
26 November 2024
16:00

SC Braga (Portugal)	4–2	(Czech Republic) SK Plzeň
Ricardo Lopes 12'23"; Tiago Brito 21'56"; Mazetto 24'22"; Rafael Henmi 39'56"	Report	Künstner 10'44"; Holý 34'52"

Pavilhão João Rocha, Lisbon
Attendance: 80
Referee: Vedran Babić (Croatia), Dominykas Norkus (Lithuania)
26 November 2024
18:30

Anderlecht (Belgium)	1–4	(Portugal) Sporting CP
Cainan 30'02"	Report	Merlim 0'12"; Zicky 14'07"; Guilherme 35'09"; Rafagnin 39'54"

Pavilhão João Rocha, Lisbon
Attendance: 2,100
Referee: Yiangos Yiangou (Cyprus), Petar Radojčić (Serbia)

27 November 2024
18:30

Anderlecht (Belgium)	6–1	(Portugal) SC Braga
Raúl Jiménez 6'04"; Cainan 12'50", 34'53", 35'27", 39'20"; Gréllo 37'11"	Report	Alexandre Cunha 8'09"

Pavilhão João Rocha, Lisbon
Attendance: 274
Referee: Petar Radojčić (Serbia), Vedran Babić (Croatia)
27 November 2024
21:30

Sporting CP (Portugal)	7–2	(Czech Republic) SK Plzeň
Tatinho 7'03"; Merlim 11'32", 28'50"; Diogo Santos 20'51", 27'54"; Sokolov 21'12"; Taynan 35'01"	Report	Francisco 32'09"; Kaká 35'14" (pen.)

Pavilhão João Rocha, Lisbon
Attendance: 1,203
Referee: Dominykas Norkus (Lithuania), Yiangos Yiangou (Cyprus)

29 November 2024
18:30

SK Plzeň (Czech Republic)	2–3	(Belgium) Anderlecht
Künstner 11'38"; Holý 36'13"	Report	Saura 12'00"; Lucas Perin 17'11", 24'26"

Pavilhão João Rocha, Lisbon
Attendance: 254
Referee: Petar Radojčić (Serbia), Yiangos Yiangou (Cyprus)
29 November 2024
21:30

Sporting CP (Portugal)	4–4	(Portugal) SC Braga
Wesley França 6'25"; Sokolov 8'07"; Taynan 21'54"; Zicky 28'22"	Report	Tiago Correia 5'00"; Tiago Sousa 12'54"; Ygor Mota 30'13"; Italo Rosseti 35'05"

Pavilhão João Rocha, Lisbon
Attendance: 2,171
Referee: Vedran Babić (Croatia), Dominykas Norkus (Lithuania)

=== Group D ===
Pos	Team	Pld	W	D	L	GF	GA	GD	Pts	Qualification
1	(Spain) Palma Futsal (H)	3	2	1	0	11	5	+6	7	Advance to final tournament
2	(Kazakhstan) Futsal Club Semey	3	2	0	1	14	5	+9	6	
3	(Poland) Rekord Bielsko-Biała	3	1	1	1	6	9	−3	4	
4	(Slovakia) MIMEL Lučenec	3	0	0	3	3	15	−12	0	

Source: UEFA
Rules for classification: Tiebreakers
(H) Hosts
27 November 2024
16:30

Rekord Bielsko-Biała (Poland)	3–1	(Slovakia) MIMEL Lučenec
Eric Panes 2'09", 17'22"; Ribeiro 26'21"	Report	Romero 36'31"

Palau Municipal d'Esports Son Moix, Palma de Mallorca
Referee: Grigori Ošomkov (Estonia), Daniel Matkovic (Switzerland)
27 November 2024
19:30

Futsal Club Semey (Kazakhstan)	1–4	(Spain) Palma Futsal
Higuita 4'37"	Report	Fabinho 5'01", 38'02", 39'06" (pen.); Machado 30'17"

Palau Municipal d'Esports Son Moix, Palma de Mallorca
Attendance: 2,900
Referee: Nicola Manzione (Italy), Gábor Kovács (Hungary)

28 November 2024
16:30

Futsal Club Semey (Kazakhstan)	5–0	(Poland) Rekord Bielsko-Biała
Dedezinho 5'20", 13'38", 33'35", 38'47"; Gabriel Candido 19'06"	Report

Palau Municipal d'Esports Son Moix, Palma de Mallorca
Attendance: 72
Referee: Gábor Kovács (Hungary), Grigori Ošomkov (Estonia)
28 November 2024
19:30

Palma Futsal (Spain)	4–1	(Slovakia) MIMEL Lučenec
Gordillo 6'39"; Fabinho 9'16", 18'15", 32'04"	Report	Romero 22'34"

Palau Municipal d'Esports Son Moix, Palma de Mallorca
Attendance: 1,560
Referee: Daniel Matkovic (Switzerland), Nicola Manzione (Italy)

30 November 2024
16:30

MIMEL Lučenec (Slovakia)	1–8	(Kazakhstan) Futsal Club Semey
Romero 30'20"	Report	Dedezinho 4'13", 9'08", 22'51", 29'19"; Ferrao 5'36"; Yesenamanov 8'21"; Karmenov 34'53"; Washington Luiz 37'18" (o.g.)

Palau Municipal d'Esports Son Moix, Palma de Mallorca
Attendance: 62
Referee: Grigori Ošomkov (Estonia), Nicola Manzione (Italy)
30 November 2024
19:30

Rekord Bielsko-Biała (Poland)	3–3	(Spain) Palma Futsal
Marek 0'15"; Eric Panes 28'00", 35'45"	Report	Machado 11'18"; Bruno Gomes 19'06"; Marcelo 36'45"

Palau Municipal d'Esports Son Moix, Palma de Mallorca
Attendance: 3,752
Referee: Gábor Kovács (Hungary), Daniel Matkovic (Switzerland)

== Final tournament ==
Semi-finals
2 May
(Kazakhstan) Kairat	3
(Spain) Jimbee Cartagena	2
2 May
(Portugal) Sporting CP	0
(Spain) Palma Futsal	3

Final
4 May
(Kazakhstan) Kairat	4
(Spain) Palma Futsal	9
Third place
4 May
(Spain) Jimbee Cartagena (p)	2 (3)
(Portugal) Sporting CP	2 (1)

=== Semi-finals ===
2 May 2025
18:00

Kairat (Kazakhstan)	3–2	(Spain) Jimbee Cartagena
Alisson 15'25", 36'26"; Cavalcanti 38'51"	Report	Darío Gil 19'43"; Motta 39'32" (pen.)

Antarès, Le Mans
Referee: Nicola Manzione (Italy), Daniel Matkovic (Switzerland)

2 May 2025
21:00

Sporting CP (Portugal)	0–3	(Spain) Palma Futsal
	Report	Gordillo 27'32"; Rivillos 38'09"; Luan Muller 39'56"

Antarès, Le Mans
Referee: Ondřej Černý (Czech Republic), Grigori Ošomkov (Estonia)

=== Third place match ===
4 May 2025
17:00

Jimbee Cartagena (Spain)	2–2	(Portugal) Sporting CP
Motta 14'51" (pen.); Waltinho 34'33"	Report	Tomás Paçó 8'14"; Sokolov 16'05" (pen.)
Penalties
Waltinho (penalty scored); Darío Gil (penalty scored); Motta (penalty scored)	3–1	(penalty missed) Taynan; (penalty missed) Wesley França; (penalty scored) Tomás Paçó; (penalty missed) Diogo Santos

Antarès, Le Mans
Attendance: 2,125
Referee: David Grøndal Nissen (Denmark), Dominykas Norkus (Lithuania)

=== Final ===
4 May 2025
20:00

Palma Futsal (Spain)	9–4	(Kazakhstan) Kairat
Gordillo 6'03"; Machado 18'00"; Rivillos 18'56"; Fabinho 22'12", 26'49", 27'28", 30'50"; Neguinho 31'11"; Mateus Maia 37'45"	Report	Caio Ruiz 8'34"; Tursagulov 32'32"; Rashit 35'13"; Arrieta 39'38"

Antarès, Le Mans
Attendance: 3,504
Referee: Dejan Veselič (Slovenia), Damian Grabowski (Poland)

UEFA Futsal Champions League
2024–25 Winners

Palma Futsal
3rd Title

== Statistics ==
=== Top goalscorers ===
Players in bold are still in the competition (as of 30 October 2024)

Rank	Player	Team	Goals
1	(Italy) **Michele Podda**	(Italy) Catania Calcio	11
2	(North Macedonia) Taulant Ismaili	(North Macedonia) FC FORCA	9
3	(Albania) Roald Halimi	(Switzerland) Futsal Minerva	8
4	(Morocco) **Soufiane El Mesrar**	(France) Étoile Lavalloise	7
4	(Finland) Aleksi Pirttijoki	(Finland) Akaa Futsal	7
