= 2022–23 Croatian First Futsal League =

Croatian First Futsal League
- Dates: 30 September 2022 – 29 May 2023
- Champions: Futsal Dinamo(1st title)
- Relegated: Universitas
- UEFA Futsal Champions League: Futsal Dinamo; Olmissum
- Matches played: 90
- Goals scored: 504 (5.6 per match)
- Top goalscorer: Andrej Pandurević (Osijek); 18 goals
- Biggest home win: Futsal Dinamo 6–1 Osijek; Vrgorac 5–0 Stanoinvest-Futsal Pula; Futsal Dinamo 6–1 Universitas; Square 6–1 Vrgorac; Stanoinvest-Futsal Pula 7–2 Osijek; Olmissum 6–1 Universitas
- Biggest away win: Torcida 3–7 Vrgorac
- Highest scoring: Osijek 7–5 Vrgorac
- All statistics correct as of 29 May 2023.

The 2022–23 Croatian First Futsal League (also known as Prva hrvatska malonogometna liga or Prva HMNL) was the 32nd season of the Croatian First Futsal League, the national championship for men's futsal teams in Croatia, since its establishment in 1992. The season started on 30 September 2022 with first round and finished on 29 May 2022 with the fourth game finals, where Futsal Dinamo beat Olmissum.

== Competition system ==
The competition takes place in two parts.

First part: Double round robin league with ten clubs playing total of 18 rounds. After end of first part top eight teams goes to playoffs while the last one is relegated and ninth goes to promotion/relegation playoff with the winner of three groups of the Second Croatian futsal league.

Second part: Playoffs in which eight best placed clubs play after the first part of the competition. The quarter-finals and semi-finals are played on two won matches, and the finals on three won matches. During the playoffs in the quarter-finals, semi-finals and finals, the better placed club from the first part of the championship retains the right to host in the first, third and eventual fifth game. Playoff match pairs are determined according to the following schedule:

Quarter-finals: 1st against 8th, 2nd against 7th, 3rd against 6th and 4th against 5th;

Semi-finals: winner of quarterfinal match 1 against winner of quarterfinal match 4 and winner of quarterfinal match 2 against winner of quarterfinal of match 3;

Finale: winner of semifinal match 1 against winner of semifinal match 2.

== Teams ==
=== Changes ===
Osijek and Torcida were promoted to the Prva HMNL after finishing on top two places in qualifications. Alumnus Sesvete was relegated finishing last in the Prva HMNL, while Šibenik 1983 was eliminated in qualification.

=== Club locations ===
Team	City	Sport hall
Crnica	Šibenik	Sportska dvorana Baldekin
Futsal Dinamo	Zagreb	Dom sportova, hall 2
Stanoinvest-Futsal Pula	Pula	Dom sportova Mate Parlov
Novo Vrijeme	Makarska	Sportski centar Makarska
Olmissum	Omiš	Sportska dvorana Ribnjak
Osijek	Osijek	Športska dvorana Zrinjevac
Square	Dubrovnik	Sportska dvorana Gospino polje
Torcida	Split	Sportski centar Gripe
Universitas	Split	Sportski centar Gripe
Vrgorac	Vrgorac	Dom sportova Vrgorac

Locations of teams in 2022–23 Prva HMNL

== League table ==
Pos	Team	Pld	W	D	L	GF	GA	GD	Pts	Qualification or relegation
1	Novo Vrijeme (X)	18	11	4	3	65	48	+17	37	Advance to the playoffs
2	Olmissum (X)	18	8	7	3	58	40	+18	31 (Note: Head-to-head points: Olmissum 6 pts, Square 0 pts)	Advance to the playoffs
3	Square (X)	18	9	4	5	47	33	+14	31	Advance to the playoffs
4	Futsal Dinamo (X)	18	8	6	4	54	30	+24	30	Advance to the playoffs
5	Vrgorac (X)	18	8	5	5	49	47	+2	29	Advance to the playoffs
6	Crnica (X)	18	7	3	8	47	53	−6	24 (Note: Head-to-head points: Crnica 4 pts, Stanoinvest-Futsal Pula 1 pts)	Advance to the playoffs
7	Stanoinvest-Futsal Pula (X)	18	7	3	8	54	55	−1	24	Advance to the playoffs
8	Osijek (X)	18	7	2	9	63	73	−10	23	Advance to the playoffs
9	Torcida (Y)	18	4	3	11	37	58	−21	15	Qualification to Relegation play-offs
10	Universitas (R)	18	1	3	14	30	67	−37	6	Relegation to Croatian Second Futsal League

Updated to match(es) played on 31 March 2023. Source: Prva HMNL (in Croatian)
Rules for classification: 1) Points; 2) Head-to-head points; 3) Head-to-head goal difference; 4) Head-to-head away goals scored; 5) Goal difference; 6) Draw.
(R) Relegated; (X) Qualified to the playoffs; (Y) Qualified to relegation playoffs

== Results ==
Each team plays home-and-away against every other team in the league, for a total of 18 matches each played.

Home \ Away	CRN	DIN	NVA	OLM	OSI	PUL	SQU	TOR	UNI	VRG
Crnica	—	2–2	2–5	3–2	4–3	4–2	2–4	2–3	4–1	4–1
Futsal Dinamo	0–2	—	3–0	1–1	6–1	3–4	2–2	3–0	6–1	5–1
Novo Vrijeme	3–1	4–3	—	4–4	4–3	7–4	3–1	6–2	4–3	3–3
Olmissum	1–2	4–4	3–2	—	7–3	3–1	3–0	2–2	6–1	1–2
Osijek	6–4	2–6	5–5	3–3	—	3–2	4–2	6–5	3–1	7–5
Stanoinvest-Futsal Pula	5–5	2–4	2–1	4–4	7–2	—	2–3	6–2	3–2	2–3
Square	6–2	2–2	4–5	1–2	3–2	1–1	—	3–1	3–0	6–1
Torcida	4–0	1–1	1–3	1–4	6–4	2–3	0–3	—	1–1	3–7
Universitas	2–2	5–4	3–5	3–5	0–4	1–4	0–2	2–3	—	3–3
Vrgorac	3–2	0–3	1–1	3–3	3–2	5–0	1–1	2–0	5–1	—

Updated to match(es) played on 31 March 2023. Source: Prva HMNL (in Croatian)
Legend: Blue = home team win; Yellow = draw; Red = away team win.

== Playoff ==
Quarter finals
Novo Vrijeme	2
Osijek	1
Futsal Dinamo	2
Vrgorac	1
Square	2
Crnica	1
Olmissum	2
Stanoinvest-Futsal Pula	0

Semi finals
Novo Vrijeme	0
Futsal Dinamo	2
Square	0
Olmissum	2

Fianals
Futsal Dinamo	3
Olmissum	1

=== Quarter-finals ===
23 April 2023
19:30 CEST

Novo Vrijeme	1–0	Osijek
Suton 23'	Report

Sportski centar Makarska, Makarska
Attendance: 400
Referee: Vedran Babić, Miloslav Šimac
28 April 2023
19:00 CEST

Osijek	1–1 (a.e.t.)	Novo Vrijeme
Pandurević 45'	Report	Suton 42'
Penalties
Čavar (penalty scored); Popović (penalty scored); Pandurević (penalty missed); Damjanović (penalty scored); Lima (penalty scored)	4–2	(penalty missed) Suton; (penalty scored) B. Gašpar; (penalty missed) Sesar; (penalty scored) Rafinha

Športska dvorana Zrinjevac, Osijek
Attendance: 300
Referee: Dino Kramar, Boris Stanić
2 May 2023
19:30 CEST

Novo Vrijeme	7–5	Osijek
Rafinha 6' 15' 32'; Juretić 11'; Barbarić 19'; Suton 25'; Sesar 40'	Report	Pandurević 2' 3' 8'; Lima 4' 27'

Sportski centar Makarska, Makarska
Attendance: 300
Referee: Mislav Džeko, Mario Blažin

Novo Vrijeme wins 2–1 overall.

24 April 2023
19:00 CEST

Olmissum	3–2	Stanoinvest-Futsal Pula
Sekulić 11' 28'; Perišić 31'	Report	Mataja 2' 13'

Sportska dvorana Ribnjak, Omiš
Attendance: 300
Referee: Mislav Džeko, Boris Stanić
28 April 2023
20:00 CEST

Stanoinvest-Futsal Pula	3–3 (a.e.t.)	Olmissum
Da. Moravac 8'; Difonzo 14' 20'	Report	Jurlina 10'; Kustura 28'; Sekulić 31'
Penalties
Mataja (penalty missed); Da. Moravac (penalty scored); Vukmir (penalty scored); Ramić (penalty scored); Bilić (penalty scored)	4–5	(penalty scored) Juretić; (penalty scored) Kustura; (penalty scored) Sekulić; (penalty scored) Jurlina; (penalty scored) Kolobarić

Dom sportova Mate Parlov, Pula
Attendance: 400
Referee: Nikola Jelić, Mario Blažin

Olmissum wins 2–0 overall.

23 April 2023
19:30 CEST

Square	7–6 (a.e.t.)	Crnica
Hrkać 5'; Džanković 18'; Radić 27' (og); Marinović 39' 48'; Turk 45'; Cvjetković 49'	Report	Žilić 13'; Vuković 22' 33'; Mudronja 30'; Copić 46'; Škugor 49'

Sportska dvorana Gospino polje, Dubrovnik
Attendance: 700
Referee: Edo Vulić, Mario Budimir
29 April 2023
19:30 CEST

Crnica	1–1	Square
Đuraš 20'	Report	Žilić 31'
Penalties
Radić (penalty scored); Perić (penalty scored); Šamija (penalty scored); Škugor (penalty scored); Mudronja (penalty scored)	5–4	(penalty scored) Cvjetković; (penalty scored) Marinović; (penalty scored) Đuraš; (penalty scored) Duvančić; (penalty missed) Hrkać

Sportska dvorana Baldekin, Šibenik
Attendance: 400
Referee: Mislav Džeko, Josip Dujmić
2 May 2023
19:30 CEST

Square	6–3	Crnica
Hrkać 4'; Marinović 6' 20'; Džanković 22'; Turk 28' 38'	Report	Primić 8' (og); Žilić 32'; Vuković 36'

Sportska dvorana Gospino polje, Dubrovnik
Attendance: 700
Referee: Mario Budimir, Mateo Šimunov

Square wins 2–1 overall.

24 April 2023
19:00 CEST

Futsal Dinamo	6–3	Vrgorac
Čekol 4' 35'; Perić 10' 26'; Zonjić 25'; Postružin 38'	Report	Dos Santos 21'; Kirevski 31'; Jelavić 35'

Dom Sportova, hall 2, Zagreb
Attendance: 400
Referee: Nikola Jelić, Dino Kramar
28 April 2023
18:00 CEST

Vrgorac	6–2	Futsal Dinamo
Dos Santos 2' 10'; Barišić 9'; Marinović 15'; Martinac 18' 37'	Report	Čekol 16'; Šućur 34'

Dom sportova Davor Jović, Vrgorac
Attendance: 500
Referee: Krešimir Grgurević, Tomislav Katinić
2 May 2023
19:00 CEST

Futsal Dinamo	3–0	Vrgorac
Zonjić 7'; Perić 17'; Čekol 38'	Report

Dom Sportova, hall 2, Zagreb
Attendance: 500
Referee: Josip Dujmić, Mario Lulić

Futsal Dinamo wins 2–1 overall.

=== Semi-finals ===
6 May 2023
19:30 CEST

Novo Vrijeme	1–2	Futsal Dinamo
Barbarić 11'	Report	Mužar 5'; F. Novak 13'

Sportski centar Makarska, Makarska
Attendance: 600
Referee: Dino Kramar, Krešimir Grgurević
12 May 2023
19:00 CEST

Futsal Dinamo	3–2	Novo Vrijeme
Dekanić 17'; Perić 18'; F. Novak 23'	Report	Juretić 4'; Jefferson 14'

Dom Sportova, hall 2, Zagreb
Attendance: 3,100
Referee: Nikola Jelić, Dino Kramar

Futsal Dinamo wins 2–0 overall.

5 May 2023
20:15 CEST

Olmissum	4–1	Square
Pavić 11'; Sekulić 20'; Kustura 33'; Marinović 33' (og)	Report	Marinović 39'

Sportska dvorana Ribnjak, Omiš
Attendance: 400
Referee: Mislav Džeko, Boris Stanić
12 May 2023
20:15 CEST

Square	1–4	Olmissum
Jurlina 40' (og)	Report	Pavić 11' 35'; Kuraja 21'; Jurlina 36'

Sportska dvorana Gospino polje, Dubrovnik
Attendance: 600
Referee: Vedran Babić, Mislav Džeko

Olmissum wins 2–0 overall.

=== Final ===
19 May 2023
20:15 CEST

Olmissum	2–1	Futsal Dinamo
Kustura 27'; Jurlina 32'	Report	Perić 17'

Sportska dvorana Ribnjak, Omiš
Attendance: 1,200
Referee: Nikola Jelić, Krešimir Grgurević
22 May 2023
19:00 CEST

Olmissum	2–4	Futsal Dinamo
Pavić 22' 39'	Report	Postružin 19'; Čekol 29'; Jurlina 37' (og); Mužar 38'

Sportska dvorana Ribnjak, Omiš
Attendance: 1,000
Referee: Mislav Džeko, Mario Lulić
26 May 2023
20:15 CEST

Futsal Dinamo	6–2	Olmissum
Čekol 2' 19' 33'; T. Novak 22'; F. Novak 27' 35'	Report	Kustura 25'; Juretić 37'

Dražen Petrović Basketball Hall, Zagreb
Attendance: 4,000
Referee: Vedran Babić, Dino Kramar
29 May 2023
20:15 CEST

Futsal Dinamo	3–1	Olmissum
Postružin 11'; Perić 15'; T. Novak 28'	Report	Kuraja 36'

Dražen Petrović Basketball Hall, Zagreb
Attendance: 4,500
Referee: Nikola Jelić, Vedran Babić

Futsal Dinamo wins 3–1 overall.

== Promotion/relegation playoff ==
=== League table ===
Pos	Team	Pld	W	D	L	GF	GA	GD	Pts	Qualification or relegation
1	Torcida (P)	6	4	1	1	26	16	+10	13	Promotion to Croatian First Futsal League
2	Uspinjača Gimka (P)	6	3	0	3	15	17	−2	9	Promotion to Croatian First Futsal League
3	Nova Gradiška (R)	6	2	1	3	25	26	−1	7	Relegation to Croatian Second Futsal League
4	Split (R)	6	1	2	3	14	21	−7	5	Relegation to Croatian Second Futsal League

Updated to match(es) played on 27 May 2023. Source: Prva HMNL (in Croatian)
Rules for classification: 1) Points; 2) Head-to-head points; 3) Head-to-head goal difference; 4) Head-to-head away goals scored; 5) Goal difference; 6) Draw.
(P) Promoted to Croatian First Futsal League; (R) Relegation to Croatian Second Futsal League

=== Results ===
Each team plays home-and-away against every other team in the league, for a total of 6 matches each played.

Home \ Away	NGR	SPL	TOR	USP
Nova Gradiška	—	8–4	4–6	6–4
Split	3–3	—	3–6	2–0
Torcida	6–3	1–1	—	5–2
Uspinjača Gimka	3–1	3–1	3–2	—

Updated to match(es) played on 27 May 2023. Source: Prva HMNL (in Croatian)
Legend: Blue = home team win; Yellow = draw; Red = away team win.

== Statistics ==
=== Top goalscorers ===
Rank	Player	Club	Goals
1	Andrej Pandurević	Osijek	19
2	Toni Jelavić	Novo Vrijeme	16
3	Vitor Hugo de Lima da Silva	Osijek	14
3	Zvonimir Šućur	Futsal Dinamo	14
5	Domagoj Damjanović	Osijek	12
5	Luka Perić	Futsal Dinamo	12
7	Kristian Čekol	Futsal Dinamo	11
7	Rafael Ferreira Lima	Novo Vrijeme	11
7	Matheus Moura Batista	Olmissum	11
9	Antonio Sekulić	Olmissum	10
9	Nikola Pavić	Olmissum	10
9	Maro Đuraš	Square	10
9	Josip Bošković	Vrgorac	10
9	Daniel Moravac	Futsal Pula	10

As of 31 March 2023
