= Amadeu =

Brazilian-born Azerbaijani futsal player

Personal information
- Full name: Amadeu Fernandes da Silva Sobrinho
- Date of birth: 6 March 1990 (age 36)
- Place of birth: Recife, Pernambuco, Brazil
- Position: Winger

Team information
- Current team: Nacional Zagreb

Senior career*
Years	Team	Apps	(Gls)
- Poker/PEC
- Copagril
- Araz Naxçivan
- Nacional Zagreb

International career
- Azerbaijan
- * Club domestic league appearances and goals

Amadeu Fernandes da Silva Sobrinho, or simply Amadeu (born 6 March 1990), is a Brazilian-born naturalized Azerbaijani professional futsal player who plays for Nacional Zagreb and the Azerbaijan national futsal team.
