= Croatian Prva HMNL =

- Founded: 1992
- Country: Croatia
- Confederation: UEFA
- Number of clubs: 10
- Level on pyramid: 1
- Relegation to: SuperSport 1. HMNL
- Domestic cup(s): Croatian Futsal Cup; Croatian Futsal Supercup
- International cup: UEFA Futsal Champions League
- Current champions: Olmissum (3) (2025–26)
- Most championships: MNK Split (8)
- Website: https://hns-cff.hr/natjecanja/mali-nogomet-futsal/1-hmnl/
- Current: 2024–25 Prva HMNL

The SuperSport HMNL (Croatian First Futsal League) is the top futsal league in Croatia.

Ten teams currently comprise the league. The Croatian First League winner is entered into the UEFA Futsal Champions League. Clubs also compete in the Croatian Futsal Cup.

The league was formed in 1991 with the dissolution of the Yugoslav leagues. It is operated by the Croatian Football Federation.

== Champions ==
Season	Winner
1991–92	Uspinjača
1992–93	Uspinjača (2)
1993–94	Sokoli
1994–95	Uspinjača (3)
1995–96	Uspinjača (4)
1996–97	Uspinjača (5)
1997–98	Orkan
1998–99	Glama-Pepsi
1999–2000	Glama-Pepsi (2)
2000–01	MNK Split (2)
2001–02	MNK Split (3)
2002–03	MNK Split (4)
2003–04	MNK Split (5)
2004–05	Orkan (2)
2005–06	MNK Split (6)
2006–07	Nacional
2007–08	Nacional (2)
2008–09	Potpićan 98
2009–10	Nacional Zagreb (3)
2010–11	MNK Split (7)
2011–12	MNK Split (8)
2012–13	Nacional Zagreb (4)
2013–14	Alumnus Sesvete (hr)
2014–15	Nacional Zagreb (5)
2015–16	Nacional Zagreb (6)
2016–17	Nacional Zagreb (7)
2017–18	Novo Vrijeme Apfel Makarska (hr)
2018–19	Novo Vrijeme Apfel Makarska (hr) (2)
2019–20	Olmissum
2020–21	Olmissum (2)
2021–22	Novo Vrijeme Makarska (hr) (3)
2022–23	Futsal Dinamo (hr)
2023–24	MNK Square Dubrovnik
2024–25	Futsal Dinamo (hr) (2)
2025–26	Olmissum (3)

== Teams 2022–23 ==
Rank	Team
1	MNK Crnica
2	MNK Futsal Dinamo
3	MNK Futsal Pula Stanoinvest
4	MNK Novo Vrijeme Makarska
5	MNK Olmissum
6	MNK Osijek
7	MNK Torcida
8	MNK Square Dubrovnik
9	AFC Universitas
10	HMNK Vrgorac
