= Matija Đulvat =

Croatian futsal player

Personal information
- Date of birth: 22 February 1976 (age 50)
- Place of birth: Zagreb (Croatia)
- Height: 1.77 m (5 ft 10 in)
- Position: Cierre

Team information
- Current team: Futsal Dinamo
- Number: 4

International career^{‡}
Years	Team	Apps	(Gls)
2003–2012	Croatia	57	(18)
- ‡ National team caps and goals as of 25 November 2019

Matija Đulvat (born 22 February 1976) is a Croatian futsal player who played for MNK Futsal Dinamo Zagreb and the Croatia national futsal team.

In July 2015 Đulvat has been elected chairman of Futsal Dinamo.
