= Uddevalla Futsal Club =

- Full name: Uddevalla Futsal Club
- Founded: 2013
- Ground: Agnebergshallen
- League: Swedish Futsal League

Uddevalla Futsal Club is a Swedish futsal association. It was formed in 2013 in Uddevalla, Sweden, and they play their home games in Agnebergshallen. Up until the 2021/22 season they were known as IFK Uddevalla Futsal but to the 2022/23 season the name was changed to clarify that the club is a separate futsal club which was not clear to all.

Uddevalla Futsal Club play in the Swedish Futsal League, and have two second place finishes in 2015 and 2016 and one win in 2017. They hosted Swedish finals of futsal in 2016.

On 25 February 2017 Uddevalla set a new attendance record for the sport of Futsal in Sweden. 1754 people saw Uddevalla take on Örebro SK in the Futsal Championships semi-final second leg in Agnebergshallen in Uddevalla. Half-time entertainment was Uddevalla's own Thomas Stenström, who is friends with many of the team.

On 4 March 2017 Uddevalla wrote club history. The national final which was played against Borås AIK in Helsingborg Arena ended 6-4 to IFK, and resulted in the first national championship for them.

The club has several players in the Sweden national futsal team such as Marcus Gerd, Fredrik Söderqvist, Granit Berisha, Petrit Zhubi and Robert Bagger.
