= F.C. Nacional =

Nacional
- Full name: Futsal Club Nacional
- Founded: 2003
- Ground: Zagreb, Croatia
Home colours	Away colours

F.C. Nacional was a futsal club based in Zagreb, Croatia. Before 2008, the club was known under the name of MNK Gospić and based in the city of Gospić.

== Honours ==
=== National ===
- Croatian Futsal League:

2006/07, 2007/08, 2009/10,2012/2013

- Croatian Futsal Cup:

2007/08, 2008/09, 2009/10
