= Mate Parlov Sport Centre =

Indoor arena in Pula, Croatia

Mate Parlov Sport Center
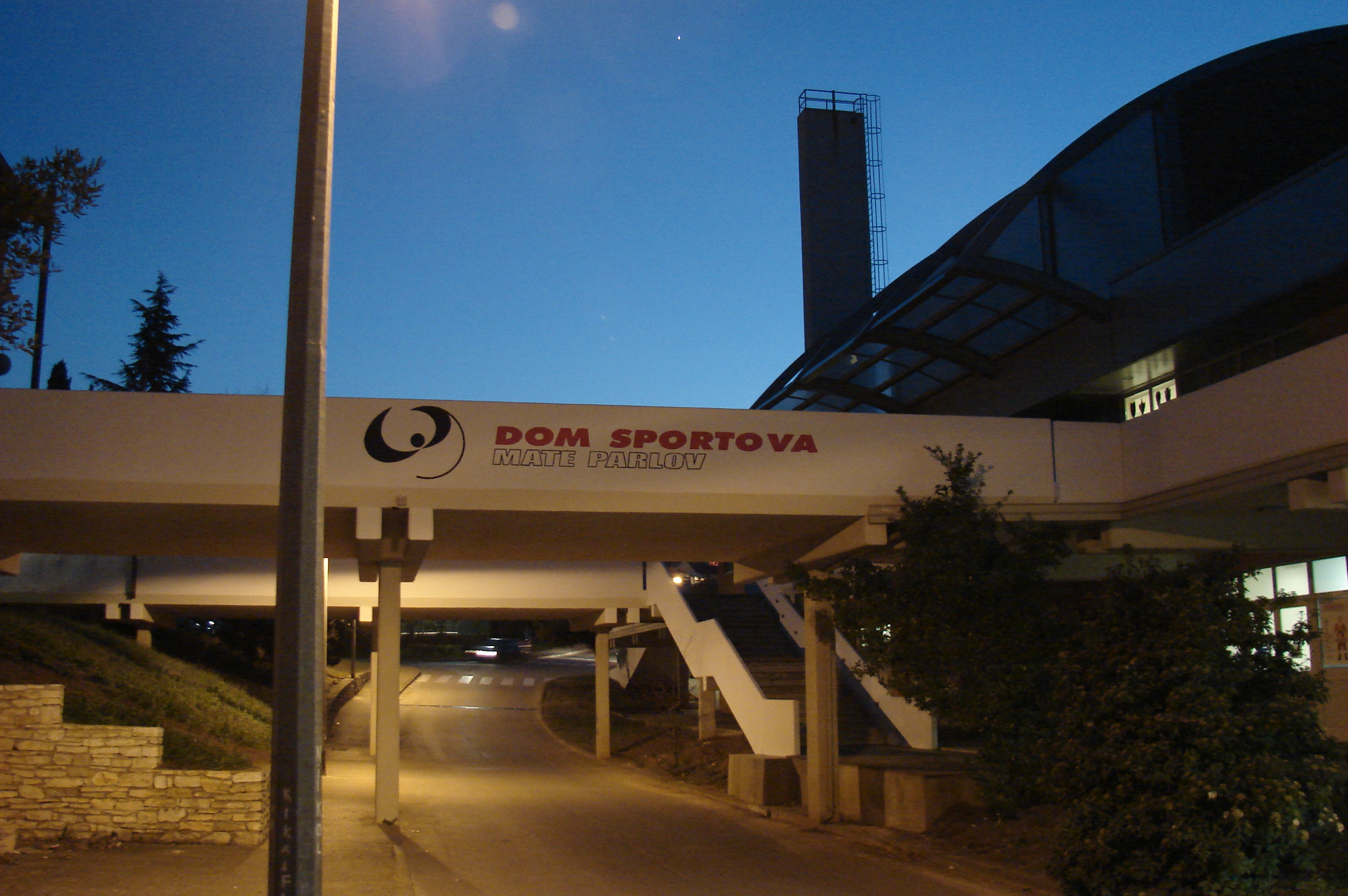
- Interactive map of Mate Parlov Sport Center
- Former names: Pula Sport Center
- Location: Pula, Croatia
- Coordinates: 44°51′28″N 13°50′7″E
- Capacity: 2,312

Construction
- Opened: 1978; 42 years ago
- Renovated: 2003

The Mate Parlov Sport Centre is a multi-purpose indoor sports arena located in Pula, Croatia. It is the home venue of the RK Arena handball team. Currently the arena has a capacity of 2,312 seats.
