= MNK Olmissum =

Futsal Croatia club

Olmissum
- Full name: Malonogometni klub Olmissum
- Nickname: Zelenoplavi (green-blue)
- Founded: 2015
- Ground: Sport Hall Ribnjak, Omiš, Croatia
- Capacity: 1,276
- President: Mijo Milavić
- Head coach: Duje Maretić
- League: Prva HMNL
- 2022–23: Prva HMNL, 2nd / RU
- Website: https://www.facebook.com/mnkolmissum/
Home colours

MNK Olmissum is a professional futsal club based in Omiš, Croatia.

== History ==
The club is founded on 1 July 2015 by Mijo Milavić and Josip Škorić. Milavić came up with the idea of founding the club after watching the matches of the UEFA Futsal EURO 2012 in the Spaladium Arena in Split with his company with which he plays recreational futsal. The club started with official competitions played in Futsal County league of Split-Dalmatia County and won it after two season, of which he won the second without losing a point.

Olmissum ends the first season in the Croatian second futsal league-group South second, in win the league next season and in the playoffs against other winners of the second league groups to achieve placement in the Croatian first futsal league.

The debut season in the Prva HMNL Olmissum ends on the second position in the regular season. In the playoffs, they beat Vrgorac in the quarterfinals, Futsal Dinamo in the semifinals and in the finals after a penalty, the double and current champion, Novo Vrijeme Apel. In the same season, they played in the Croatian futsal cup finals, but were defeated by Uspinjača Gimka 1–5.

In the 2020–21 season, Olmissum made its debut in the UEFA Futsal Champions League, and reached the round of 16 where it lost 1–2 to KPRF. In the domestic championship, the title was defended after the first place in the regular season, and the victory over Square (2–0 in the series), Futsal Dinamo (2–0 in the series) and Novo Vrijeme (3–0 in the series). In the same season, Olmissum won the first cup title with a victory over Vrgorac after 11 series of penalties. the club is from the town named Omiš.It is currently known for playing against HMNK Rijeka in finals.

== Current team ==
As of 20 October 2022

No.	Player	Nation
1	Josip Bilandžić	(Croatia)
4	Duje Kustura	(Croatia)
7	Jakov Hrstić	(Croatia)
8	Toni Kirevski	(Croatia)
9	Nikola Pavić	(Croatia)
10	Josip Jurlina	(Croatia)
11	Marko Kuraja	(Croatia)
13	Nikola Čizmić	(Croatia)
14	Antonio Juretić	(Croatia)
15	Stjepan Perišić	(Croatia)
17	Josip Kolobarić	(Croatia)
18	Matheus Moura Batista	(Brazil)
19	Valerije Jurić	(Croatia)
23	Antonio Sekulić	(Croatia)
24	Tonino Zorotović	(Croatia)
41	Božidar Baučić	(Croatia)
	Iiro Vanha	(Finland)

Source: HNS

== European competitions record ==
As of 5 December 2021

Season	Competition	Round	Opponent	Result
2020–21	UEFA Futsal Champions League	PR	(Estonia) Viimsi Smsraha	9–1
2020–21	UEFA Futsal Champions League	R32	(Belgium) Charleroi	4–1
2020–21	UEFA Futsal Champions League	R16	(Russia) KPRF	1–2
2021–22	UEFA Futsal Champions League	Main	(Serbia) KMF FON	3–1
2021–22	UEFA Futsal Champions League	Main	(Austria) Diamant Linz	6–0
2021–22	UEFA Futsal Champions League	Main	(Armenia) Leo	5–0
2021–22	UEFA Futsal Champions League	Elite	(Portugal) Sporting CP	1–3
2021–22	UEFA Futsal Champions League	Elite	(Russia) Sinara Yekaterinburg	2–3
2021–22	UEFA Futsal Champions League	Elite	(Netherlands) Hovocubo	4–3
2023–24	UEFA Futsal Champions League	Main	(Portugal) Sporting CP	
2023–24	UEFA Futsal Champions League	Main	(Kazakhstan) MFC Ayat	
2023–24	UEFA Futsal Champions League	Main	(Ukraine) HIT Kyiv	

Source: UEFA Live Scores

== Honours ==
National competitions

- Croatian Prva HMNL: 3
  - 2019–20, 2020–21, 2025–26
- Croatian Druga HMNL: 1
  - 2018–19
- Split-Dalmatia County Futsal League: 1
  - 2016–17
- Croatian Futsal Cup: 1
  - 2020–21
- Futsal Cup of the South region: 2
  - 2018–19, 2019–20
