= MNK Futsal Dinamo =

Futsal Croatia club

Futsal Dinamo
- Full name: Malonogometni klub Futsal Dinamo
- Nicknames: Modri, Plavi (The Blues), Purgeri, Small Dinamo
- Founded: 2012; 14 years ago
- Ground: Dom Sportova; Kutija Šibica
- Capacity: 3,100; 1,200
- Chairman: Matija Đulvat
- League: First Croatian Futsal Division
| Home colours | Away colours |

MNK Futsal Dinamo is a Croatian professional futsal club from Zagreb, established on 21 March 2012. Futsal Dinamo is a fan-owned club. Members of the club elect their leadership through democratic elections and the business operations are completely transparent. The main objective of the club is to gather fans of Dinamo Zagreb and promote futsal as a sport. Also, the goal of the club is to be self-sustaining and financially independent. All the funds the club acquires are exclusively invested in the development of the club and its sports sections.

Unsatisfied with the situation in GNK Dinamo, the ultras group of the club, Bad Blue Boys, and the members of the club decided to get involved in the functioning of the Futsal Dinamo (club founded by futsal enthusiasts and supporters of Dinamo) in order to continue the tradition of supporting Dinamo and to demonstrate the model of a fan-owned club.

The first democratic elections in the club were held on 11 July 2015. Assembly of the Club, consisted of its members, had unanimously chosen Matija Đulvat as the club's president. The second democratic elections were held on 12 July 2019 and Assembly of the Club had again unanimously chosen Đulvat as the club's president for the next four years. Futsal Dinamo is currently participating in the First Croatian futsal division. Futsal Dinamo has three Regional Cups and the club lost in the semi-finals of Croatian first division in the last five seasons, twice against Split twice against champions Novo Vrijeme from Makarska and once (2019/20) against the current champion Olmissum from Omiš.

== History ==
=== The foundation of the Club ===
MNK Futsal Dinamo was founded by Matija Đulvat and Mate Čuljak on 21 March 2012. The first president of the club was Matija Đulvat, current president and the captain of the team. Mate Čuljak was the first coach of the club. The assistant coach was Juraj Fabijanić, the acting president of the club in season 2014/15.

In the first season the club competed in the Second Croatian Futsal Division North. The Club finished the season in second place and was very close to ensure qualification group for the First Croatian Futsal Division.

Because of the financial difficulties in the next season (2013/14) the club did not participate in the senior competition, however, it continued to compete in the youth categories.

=== Entry of the Bad Blue Boys in the Club ===
Supporters of GNK Dinamo, ultras group Bad Blue Boys and the members of the club who have been unsatisfied with current leadership of GNK Dinamo. for a number of years decided to present to the public a democratic model of club ownership based on which GNK Dinamo should function according to law. In spring of 2014 they came up with an idea of establishing their own futsal club with which they wanted to re-stimulate the forgotten trend of going to football matches in Zagreb City and to demonstrate the fan owned club model. Since there was already a club MNK Futsal Dinamo, founded by futsal enthusiasts and big fans of Dinamo, Bad Blue Boys have contacted the leading men of the club. They agreed that the senior team will be reactivated, and that the members of the club will elect their leadership in democratic elections. Each member will be entitled to participate in the Assembly of the club and, thus, become one of its owners.

However, Futsal Dinamo is not a substitute for the "football" Dinamo which cannot be replaced by anything. The main goal of this project is to demonstrate the model of fan owned club with completely transparent way doing business. It also aims to maintain the tradition of supporting Dinamo and to promote futsal as a sport. The desire of its fans is to fuse football and futsal Dinamo, in an appropriate time.

==== Official presentation of the project MNK Futsal Dinamo ====
Project Futsal Dinamo was officially presented on the iconic Zagreb stadium Šalata with an exhibition match between Futsal Dinamo and "Dinamo All Stars" on 6 September 2014, the 47th anniversary of Dinamo winning the only Croatian football European trophy, The Inter-Cities Fairs Cup. Team "Dinamo All Stars" consisted of many legends of Dinamo Zagreb such as Igor Bišćan, Silvio Marić, Dario Šimić, Tomislav Šokota, Slavko Ištvanić, Zvonimir Soldo and others.

On the outdoor stadium, more than four thousand people have gathered. For three hours Dinamo's fans have cheered for Dinamo and chanted its name, the match ended 4:4.

The official presentation of the Club had made a great media and public impact in Croatia and among futsal enthusiasts worldwide.

Futsal Dinamo at Šalata

=== Competition season 2014/15, 2.HMNL ===
Competition season 2014/15 Futsal Dinamo opened on 12 October 2014 in Small Hall of "Dom Sportova" (The home of Sports) against MNK Siscia, the previous year champion of Second Croatian Futsal Division North. Dinamo won the game with 6:1. In the second round of the League, Dinamo had only one draw in all matches of the first part of Championship. An away match against MNK Kozakiv ended 2:2. But, after that, Dinamo achieved four victories against MNK Petrinjčica (8:3), MNK Zagreb 92 (4:0), MNK Agram Extreme 4:3 and MNK Rugvica 7:3, in a derby match.

In the last round of the first part of the Championship Dinamo played against MNK Patriot and become a half-season Champion after 5:0 win. The match was held in the iconic Zagreb's sports Hall, the Dražen Petrović Arena in front of five and a half thousand of Dinamo supporters. In the second part of the season, Dinamo defeated MNK Siscia (11:1), Kozakiv (6:0), Petrinjčica (2:1) and Zagreb 92 (5:1). The only defeat during the whole Championship, Dinamo had on 20 April 2015 against Agram Extreme (6:8). A Champion of the Second Croatian Futsal Division North was decided in the game against a direct competitor MNK Rugvica in Small Hall of Dom Sportova. Dinamo won that match 4:0 and secured its first title in the history.

Dinamo opened the qualification group to enter the first Division with two great victories, against Crnica from Šibenik (7:2) and Aurelia from Vinkovci (5:0). After that Dinamo defeated Potpićan in Labin in a tight match (3:2), and ensured its leap to First Division with victories over Crnica (5:1), and Aurelia (3:2). The end of the great season, in which Dinamo clinched Second Division North, Regional Cup and mini-league of regional champions, was celebrated in a home match against Potpićan. The game ended 4:2 for Dinamo.

==== Croatian futsal Cup ====
Dinamo started the Cup competition in 1/8 finals of the Regional Cup. The first match was an away game against the first league squad Novi Marof. Dinamo won 7:2, and during that game, GNK Dinamo's legend, Tomislav Šokota, scored a hat-trick. In ¼ finals, Dinamo defeated Kozakiv (3:1), and in semi-finals Rugvica with 8:2. On that game Šokota scored another hat-trick. In the regional cup finals Dinamo played against the previous year Croatian champion, Alumnus. In completely filled Dražen Petrović Arena, Dinamo won a dramatic match after turning the result in the last two minutes of the match. With that victory, Dinamo clinched its first trophy in history, and secured qualification to the National Cup. In 1/8 finals of National Cup, Dinamo lost against reigning Croatian champion and reigning winner of Croatian Cup, Nacional.

=== Competition season 2015/16, 1.HMNL ===
Dinamo had its debut in the First Croatian Futsal Division on 18 September 2015 in Dom Sportova, when they defeated Potpićan with 9:0. After that Dinamo won all home matches in the first half of the season. They defeated Murter with 6:1, Solin with 7:1, Square Dubrovnik with 4:1, Novo Vrijeme Makarska with 2:0, and Alumnus Zagreb with 4:3. In six home matches, Dinamo had six victories with goal difference 32:6.

Futsal Dinamo in Dom sportova Sports Hall

On the other hand, in five away matches during half-season, Dinamo had only one draw (against Uspinjača 1:1), and five defeats (Osijek Kelme 3:2, Vrgorac 2:1, Nacional 4:0 and Split Tommy 7:1). Futsal Dinamo finished the half season in a third place with 14 points behind the leading team Nacional. Dinamo's top scorer in the half-season was Davor Kanjuh with eight goals.

In the second half of the season Futsal Dinamo defeated Potpićan (7:1), Osijek Kelme (4:2), Murter (7:3), Vrgorac (4:2), Solin (5:3), Uspinjača (3:2), Novo Vrijeme (7:1) and Alumnus (6:2). They lost against Nacional (0:3), Square (4:8) and Split Tommy (2:4). Futsal Dinamo finished third in the regular part of the season and secured his place in play-offs against Split Tommy. Dinamo's top scorer in the regular season was Kanjuh with 17 goals.

==== Croatian futsal Cup ====
Jus like season before, Dinamo started his Cup competition in Regional Cup North. In the ¼ finals Dinamo defeated last year's finalist Alumnus with 3:1. In semi-finals Dinamo defeated Novi Marof in away game with 4:1 and in finals Rugvica with 5:2. That was Dinamo's fourth trophy in history and the Club advanced to the national Cup competition.

In 1/8 finals of Croatian Cup Futsal Dinamo played against Square from Dubrovnik. Dinamo won in Zagreb (4:0), and lost in Dubrovnik (1:2) and secured its place in the final eight tournament. On the final tournament, Futsal Dinamo lost in quarter-finals against champions Split Tommy (4:6).

In the playoffs Futsal Dinamo lost against Split Tommy. The first match ended 6:7, and second 1:2.

=== Competition season 2016/17, 1.HMNL ===
During the summer break, Futsal Dinamo signed two national Croatian futsal team selection players Vedran Matošević and Kristijan Grbeša and one England national futsal team player Douglas Reed. Before the beginning of the season, Futsal Dinamo played on a strong international tournament in Switzerland on which Dinamo defeated strong Czech club Era-Pack Chrudim and lost in finals (0:1) against Benfica.

Futsal Dinamo opened the season with 1:1 draw against Novo Vrijeme from Makarska at home ground. After that, Dinamo secured six consecutive victories, against Alumnus 8:4, Solin (5:2), Uspinjača (3:2), Square from Dubrovnik 7:6, Vrgorac (2:1) and Osijek (3:2). After that Dinamo lost two home matches against Split Tommy (2:3) and Nacional (2:4), and won on away matches in Slavonski Brod against Brod 035 (6:3), and Labin against Potpićan 98 Istra (4:1). Dinamo finished the first part of the season in third place with four points behind the leading Nacional. The best scorer of Futsal Dinamo in half-season was Grbeša with 11 goals.

==== Croatian futsal Cup ====
The third year in the row, Futsal Dinamo started its Cup competition from Regional Cup. In quarter finals, Dinamo defeated Novi Marof with 10:0, and in semi-finals Alumnus with 6:2. The second year in the row Dinamo played its finals game in Karlovac and secured the third consecutive title by defeating MNK Jesenje from Zagorje. Futsal Dinamo secured its place in the National Cup.

Futsal Dinamo and its fans

=== Competition season 2017/18, 1.HMNL ===
Third season for Futsal Dinamo in Croatian first futsal division saw the club take the lead on the table for the first time in history. Summer transfer window was very busy in Futsal Dinamo as Doug Reed, Antonia Franja, Sadat Ziberi and Matej Horvat left the club, while Hrvoje Penava and Kristijan Grbeša were sent on loan for the first part of the season. Recruitments came from the club's academy with hot prospects joining first team: Vito Gagulić, Ivan Šulentić, Danijel Dekanić and Tomislav Hercigonja. Matija Rajh was the only player to join the club outside the academy prospects.

Futsal Dinamo recorded a loss in the season opener at home versus Split Tommy (2:4). However, Futsal Dinamo afterwards won ten straight matches against every other opponent in the division, recording also its first victory against city rivals Nacional. Historic first place in the division came after Week 9 and win against MNK Uspinjača. Futsal Dinamo held the position until the winter break and was crowned fall champion for the first time in its history. Spring season opener was another match versus Split Tommy, where Futsal Dinamo probably played its worst game of the season, losing 6:2 without proper contest and losing the top spot. However, after another series of wins, which included another derby win against Nacional, Futsal Dinamo found itself again on the top of the first division table. Club managed to stay at the top until a 4:4 draw in a thriller match versus MNK Square Dubrovnik away. That draw saw Futsal Dinamo giving the top spot to Split Tommy. At the end of the regular season, Futsal Dinamo finished second with record of 18 wins, 2 draws and 2 losses.

Second place in the regular season was Futsal Dinamo best result in its history and saw them „skipping“ quarter-final in championship playoffs. In semi-finals, Futsal Dinamo played the best-out-of-three against Novo Vrijeme Makarska. In first match in front of home crowd in Zagreb, Futsal Dinamo won 3:1 with Penava, Prgomet and Kanjuh scoring one goal each. However, spectators on second match of the series in Makarska witnessed one of the worst performances of Futsal Dinamo this season after 4:0 defeat. Third and final match of the series was a proper thriller where Futsal Dinamo was losing two times and two times managed to come back. Matija Capar scored the equalizing goal for 2:2 just 20 seconds before full-time and took the game to overtime. Despite many chances in overtime, neither team scored a goal and match went to penalties. After five series of penalty kicks, Novo Vrijeme Makarska clinched a spot in the finals and left Futsal Dinamo to end its season in semi-finals once again. In regard to the club’s top scorer list that season, Kristijan Grbeša scored most goals (22), followed by Davor Kanjuh (21), Vedran Matošević (20), Mihovil Prgomet (19) and Kristian Čekol (13).

==== Croatian futsal cup ====
After securing better coefficient in the cup system after years of playing in preliminary Regional cup, Futsal Dinamo was awarded direct participation in National cup. In first and second round, Futsal Dinamo secured wins against MNK Murter (3:5) and MNK Alumnus (9:1) and reserved its spot in the final-four series in Našice, together with MNK Vrgorac, Split Tommy and hosts MNK Našice. Opponent in the semi-final was MNK Vrgorac who showed that they are no pushovers as they cruised to 5:1 victory eliminating Futsal Dinamo from the Cup.

==== Scorers and tragedies ====
Farewell to the Oskar and Matija

Unfortunately, 2017/2018 season will be known as the darkest period in the short history of the club due to the two terrible tragedies that struck the ‘Blue family’. At the end of December 2017, one of the club's founders and its first coach Mate Čuljak suddenly died after collapsing during the friendly tournament. At the end of the season, five days after the last match of the season against Novo Vrijeme (2:2), Matija Capar, player and Futsal Dinamo's futsal Academy director, as well as young Academy cadet Oskar Kadrnka died in an automobile accident upon returning from cadets’ tournament in Šibenik on which U15 selection of the club won a bronze medal.

=== Competition season 2018/19, 1.HMNL ===
Futsal Dinamo had its season premiere on the fifth traditional Šalata event and has hosted famous Greek club Panathinaikos. Due to the good relations between Bad Blue Boys and Gate 13, many Greek fans were present on the stands of Šalata. Dinamo won the match 5:4 and fans created yet another spectacular atmosphere. However, Dinamo did not enter 2018/2019 campaign in a good way. In first three weeks, Dinamo had two surprising draws against Brod (3:3) and Crnica (2:2), while Dinamo lost in an away match against Novo Vrijeme (1:4). However, Blues managed to consolidate and after a series of victories jumped to the upper part of the league table. One match before the end of the regular part of the season Dinamo was second. However, in the last match in Dom Sportova Hall, Dinamo played a 3:3 draw against AFC Universitas, conceding a goal in the last second and thus falling to fourth place in the division. In Playoffs, Dinamo played against its city rival Uspinjača Gimka. In first match of the series, Uspinjača Gimka won 2:1 despite having 72 shots directed towards their goal. In second match, Dinamo won and equalized the series to 1-1. In the dramatic third and deciding match in Dom Sportova Hall, Dinamo won 5:4 thanks to Davor Kanjuh’s goal 15 seconds before full time and managed to clinch league’s semi-final where they would meet Novo Vrijeme. Novo Vrijeme was better opponent in two matches against Dinamo and they stopped Dinamo for the second time in row in the Playoff semi-finals.

==== Croatian futsal cup ====
Futsal Dinamo was not obligated to play Regional cup this year as well, but it did not manage to overcome the first obstacle in the National cup. Despite having a 3:1 lead at the half-time in an away match against Uspinjača Gimka in Sutinska vrela Sports Hall, Uspinjača managed to clinch the 5:4 victory in the end.

=== Competition season 2019/20, 1.HMNL ===
Futsal Dinamo started the season with traditional match on Šalata. This year's guest was Italian club Milano Calcio A5, and Dinamo won 2:0. The season didn't started well for the club. Dinamo lost first two rounds (against Novo Vrijeme and Square) and draw in third against Alumnus. The first victory of the season Dinamo achieved in the fourth round defeating Crnica 4:0 in Kutija šibica. The first round of the season Dinamo ended on the 5th place with only three victories. But, in the second part of the season, Dinamo was the only Croatian club without a loss defeating the league leader Olmissum in an away match (2:1) just before the competition was suspended due to coronavirus outbreak.

After the "COVID 19 break" the season continued in mid-June 2020. Dinamo secured victories in the last three matches of the regular season (Universitas, Split and Uspinjača Gimka), and finished third before the playoffs. In the quarterfinals, Dinamo defeated their city-rivals Uspinjača Gimka after another thrilling match (4:2 in overtime) and lost to the later champion Olmissum in Omiš (0:1).

The club's top season goalscorer was Kristian Čekol with 16 goals, and he has also been voted the best player of the season by profession and supporters. The assist-leader of the season was Davor Kanjuh with 15 assists.

==== Croatian futsal cup ====
Futsal Dinamo defeated Brod 035 (from second tier) in the first round of the Croatian cup, and lost in the quarter-finals in the match against Olmissum in Omiš (2:3).

=== Season by season record ===
| Season | League | Level | GP | W | D | L | GD | Pts | Pos |
|---|---|---|---|---|---|---|---|---|---|
| 2012-13 | 2. HMNL - North | 2 | 15 | 10 | 1 | 4 | | 31 | 2 |
| 2013-14 | Did not compete in this season due to financial difficulties. | | | | | | | | |
| 2014-15 | 2. HMNL - North | 2 | 13 | 11 | 1 | 1 | 70-23 | 34 | 1 |
| 2014-15 | Playoffs (league format) | 2 | 6 | 6 | 0 | 0 | 27-9 | 18 | 1 |
| 2015-16 | 1. HMNL | 1 | 22 | 14 | 1 | 7 | 87-54 | 43 | 3 |
| 2015-16 | Playoffs (cup format, top four teams) | 1 | 2 | 0 | 0 | 2 | 7-9 | semifinal | |
| 2016-17 | 1. HMNL | 1 | 22 | 16 | 1 | 4 | 96-60 | 49 | 3 |
| 2016-17 | Playoffs (cup format, top six teams) | 1 | 5 | 3 | 0 | 2 | 11-11 | semifinal | |
| 2017-18 | 1. HMNL | 1 | 22 | 18 | 2 | 2 | 109-46 | 56 | 2 |
| 2017-18 | Playoffs (cup format, top six teams) | 1 | 3 | 1 | 1 | 1 | 5-7 | semifinal | |
| 2018-19 | 1. HMNL | 1 | 22 | 12 | 5 | 5 | 77-54 | 41 | 4 |
| 2018-19 | Playoffs (cup format, top six teams) | 1 | 5 | 2 | 0 | 3 | 19-25 | semifinal | |
| 2019-20 | 1. HMNL | 1 | 18 | 9 | 5 | 4 | 58-43 | 32 | 3 |
| 2019-20 | Playoffs (cup format, top six teams) | 1 | 2 | 1 | 0 | 1 | 4-3 | semifinal | |

promoted

GP - games played; W - games won; D - games drawn; L - games lost; GD - goal-differential; Pts - points won; Pos - final position/playoff result (stage of elimination)

==== Records ====
Biggest win: Futsal Dinamo - Siscia 11-1 (2012–13, league)
Biggest defeat: Uspinjača - Futsal Dinamo 8-1 (2012–13, league)

== Colors and coat of arms ==
=== Colors ===
The color of MNK Futsal Dinamo is blue, which is also the color of GNK Dinamo. The away set consists of a white T-shirt, dark blue shorts and white socks. The third set has a dark blue T-shirt with dark blue shorts and white socks.

=== Club Crest ===
Futsal Dinamo's crest is shaped as a shield and topped with a white crown. The shield represents the desire of the club to "defend, preserve and promote the fundamental values of sport". The dominant color blue in the field of the shield reflects the official color of the club. The middle of the field has a stylized white letter "d". Inside the crown there is a blue-colored motto, "FUTSAL DINAMO".

This crest is inspired by the earlier official GNK Dinamo crest (1950-1969) when the Dinamo clinched two former Yugoslavia league titles and the only Croatian won European title, Inter-Cities Fairs Cup in 1967.

== Sports Hall ==
Futsal Dinamo does not have a permanent home. Club plays its home matches at various sports halls in Zagreb City. Dinamo played most of the matches in Dom Sportova sports hall, but it also played at Dražen Petrović Basketball Hall, Sutinska Vrela, Martinovka, SD Trešnjevka, sports hall in Dubrava and two times in Karlovac.

== The organization of the club ==
The club is owned by its members who elect their leadership in democratic elections. Therefore, each member is also the "owner" of the club. All club members with voting rights are entitled to participate in the Assembly of the club. The members under 18 years of age can participate in the functioning of the Assembly, but have no voting rights. Any physical person can become a member of the club if they pay the membership fee and register in the Members registry which allows them all membership rights and obligations. The club bodies are: the Assembly, the Presidency, the Supervisory Board and Disciplinary Commission. The club Assembly is the highest governing body of the club, composed of work-capable club members. Regular session of the Assembly is organized at least once a year, while the Electoral Assembly is held once in four years. The Presidency is the executive body of the club. It performs all functions prescribed by the Statute such as managing sports and other policies of the club, representing the club, asset management, naming the sports director of the club and others. The President is elected by the members of the Electoral Assembly for a mandate of four years. Any member of the Presidency has to be proposed to the Assembly by the club president and the Presidency is obligated to submit a yearly report to the Assembly. The Supervisory Board of the Club monitors and oversees the work of the club bodies constituted by the statute. The Supervisory Board members are elected by the Assembly. A candidate must be nominated by at least 20 voting members and he or she must agree with their nomination. The mandate of Supervisory Board members lasts four years.

The Disciplinary Committee is a club body which monitors the responsibilities of the members of the club. Club members are disciplinary liable for any violation of their membership duties. They can receive a warning or be expelled from the club. The Disciplinary Committee consists of three members for a term of four years. The members of Disciplinary committee are appointed and dismissed by the Assembly.

The first electoral assembly of the Club was held on 11 July 2015. By unanimous decision, the Assembly elected Matija Đulvat as the club's president, Juraj Čošić as the club's vice-president. The club's secretary-general is Kristijan Tudja. Juraj Fabijanić, Nikola Majpruz and Domagoj Purgar were elected in the Supervisory board as members.

=== Membership in the Club ===
The annual membership fee is 80 kunas (around 10.5 €). By becoming a member each person receives an appropriate gift. The sum of 80kn for the fee was decided upon the first club referendum. Currently, the club has more than one thousand members. In the first year (2014) Dinamo had 1608 members, in the second (2015) 1325, in the third (2016) 1603 and in the fourth (2017) 1554 members. In the current year (2018) Dinamo has broken the record of annual memberships and currently has more than 2000 members.

== The vision of the club ==
The idea for this project is that Futsal Dinamo becomes one day an official part of the GNK Dinamo sports community, like citizens associations from Spain (FC Barcelona) and Portugal (S.L. Benfica, Sporting CP) are. The objective is to continue with the affirmation of the fan owned club model and to promote futsal and sports in general.

== Futsal Dinamo Futsal Academy ==
Dinamo youth squad generation 2001/02

Apart from first team, Futsal Dinamo also has U21, U19, U17, U15, U13, U11, U9, U7 and U5 squads. More than 110 children are currently training at Dinamo’s Futsal Academy, coached by eight professional coaches at four different locations in Zagreb (SD Megaton, SD Fair Play, SD Martinovka and SD Dom Sportova). Most prominent success of the Futsal Academy is the appearance at the Croatian national finals for U21 selection and U13 bronze medal on Club World Cup in Barcelona in 2017. Head of Dinamo’s Futsal Academy is Petra Mandić.

== e-Futsal Dinamo ==
e-sport Futsal Dinamo

E-sports team On the first Members’ Tournament in EA Sport’s FIFA 2020 video game, held on October 6, 2019, Futsal Dinamo founded its e-sports team. Players who are training at the club are playing various FIFA tournaments under Futsal Dinamo crest. The goal of e-sports team is to motivate young people to do sports and be good students while playing video games in their free time. Premiere match of Dinamo’s e-sport team was on eDinamo Cup, organized by GNK Dinamo, while Andrija Vrcan at the Supernova Garden Mall Tournament seized first trophy for the club in e-sports category. One of the first team goalkeepers Tomislav Hercigonja is a member of e-sports team, as well as Filip Novak, club’s junior and current Vice-Champion of Croatia in FIFA. Another club’s junior Andrija Vrcan and Tomislav Špiljar, former junior and club’s trustee are also member of the e-sports selection.

During the coronavirus pandemic, Futsal Dinamo started organizing Dinamo's online tournaments and played the first ever e-sports match between two sports-clubs. In the e-sports match against Uspinjača Gimka, Dinamo won with 2-1-1.

== Squad 2019/20 ==
| No. | Player | Full name | Position | Nationality |
|---|---|---|---|---|
| 1 | Herceg | Mario Herceg | Goalkeeper | (Croatia) |
| 12 | Hercigonja | Tomislav Hercigonja | Goalkeeper | (Croatia) |
| 22 | Bešlić | Danijel Bešlić | Goalkeeper | (Croatia) |
| 33 | Maloševac | Karlo Maloševac | Goalkeeper | (Croatia) |
| 4 | Đulvat | Matija Đulvat | Defender | (Croatia) |
| 10 | Kanjuh | Davor Kanjuh | Defender | (Croatia) |
| 14 | Mužar | Mateo Mužar | Defender | (Croatia) |
| 7 | Šulentić | Ivan Šulentić | Left Winger | (Croatia) |
| 9 | Grbić | Robert Grbić | Left Winger | (Croatia) |
| 15 | Gagulić | Vito Gagulić | Left Winger | (Croatia) |
| 8 | Cvišić | Dominik Cvišić | Right Winger | (Croatia) |
| 17 | Čekol | Kristijan Čekol | Right Winger | (Croatia) |
| 20 | Dekanić | Danijel Dekanić | Right Winger | (Croatia) |
| 21 | Prgomet | Mihovil Prgomet | Pivot | (Croatia) |
| 23 | Grubeša | Josip Grubeša | Pivot | (Croatia) |
| 29 | Penava | Hrvoje Penava | Pivot | (Croatia) |
| 77 | Mudronja | Jakov Mudronja | Pivot | (Croatia) |

- Number 6 is retired and symbolizes every member who represents the sixth player on the field.
- Number 2 is retired in the memory of the tragically deceased Matija Capar (20.10.1984.-04.06.2018.)
- Number 18 is retired in the memory of the tragically deceased Oskar Kadrnka (22.03.2003.-04.06.2018.)

== Club honours ==
=== National competitions ===
- Croatian Futsal League: 2
  - 2022-23, 2023-24
- Second Croatian Futsal Division: 1
  - 2014–15
- Play-offs for First Croatian Futsal Division: 1
  - 2014–15

=== Regional competitions ===
- Croatian Regional Cup North: 1
  - 2014–15, 2015–16, 2016–17

== Humanitarian character ==
The club has supported the organization "Palčić Gore" (Thumb Up) which provides assistance to the premature born and ill children. The funds to support this organization were collected at the most visited match of the club against Patriot (5.500 people in Dražen Petrović Arena, 1 December 2014) through various items sale. During the winter break the club organized a charity match against the stars of Scandinavian futsal who played under the name "Nordic Stars". The overall profit realized from the sale of the tickets was donated to the association "St. Vinko Paulski" from Vukovar which takes care of citizens with lower income and parents with more children.

Since then, Futsal Dinamo organizes the charitable event as a part of the league match during the Feast of Saint Nicholas. On December 7, 2019, Futsal Dinamo organized the biggest charitable event since then at the derby against Split played in Basketball sports hall Dražen Petrović. Futsal Dinamo invited five charitable organizations (Palčići, Jedni za druge, Judo club for people with disabilities Fuji, Down Syndrom centar Pula, Saint Vinko Paulski Vukovar), included them in the sports match and blue Saint Nicholas gave their members meaningful gifts. Futsal Dinamo also donated part of the income of ticket sales to the charitable organizations.

Players, management and the fans of the club are in "Kolona Sjećanja" (Memorial Walk) every year on the anniversary of Vukovar's fall in Croatian War for Independence (18 November). They also pay tribute to victims by visiting the Memorial Cemetery, Ovčara and Vukovar hospital. On those days Futsal Dinamo plays a friendly match against Aurelia, futsal club from neighbouring Vinkovci.

In March 2015 Futsal Dinamo took part in the humanitarian indoor futsal spectacle in Kutina, organized with the purpose of raising funds for the family of Veljko Marić, veteran of Croatian War for Independence. Dinamo clinched tournament defeating Kutina in the finals with 6:5 and raised 10 000 kn (around 1.500 €) to donate the Marić family.

Exactly one year after the official presentation on Šalata, Dinamo presented the team for the new season at the same place. For that occasion, the club organized a competition among the members to design the shirts whose sales revenue was donated to the association "For each other", that deals with addiction prevention, social and psychological rehabilitation and re-socialization of former drug addicts and people with disabilities.

The club appeals to its members to engage in voluntary work in the club and promotes more involvement in communities so the club can be as successful as possible.
