= 2016–17 UEFA Futsal Cup =

Tournament details
- Dates: Qualifying rounds: 16 August – 27 November 2016; Final tournament: 28–30 April 2017
- Teams: Final tournament: 4 Total: 52 (from 51 associations)

Final positions
- Champions: (Spain) Inter FS (4th title)
- Runners-up: (Portugal) Sporting CP
- Third place: (Kazakhstan) Kairat Almaty
- Fourth place: (Russia) Gazprom-Ugra Yugorsk

Tournament statistics
- Matches played: 112
- Goals scored: 817 (7.29 per match)
- Top scorer(s): Season total: Bolinha; Alen Fetić; Nenê; Rami Tirkkonen; Denis Totošković (9 goals each); Final tournament: Ricardinho (4 goals)

The 2016–17 UEFA Futsal Cup was the 31st edition of Europe's premier club futsal tournament. This was the 16th edition under the current UEFA Futsal Cup format organized by UEFA.

In the final, Inter FS defeated Sporting CP to win their fourth title. Kairat Almaty defeated Ugra Yugorsk, who were the defending champions, to finish third.

== Teams ==
A total of 52 teams from 51 of the 55 UEFA member associations entered the tournament, which was a record number of entries and included first-time entrants from Kosovo and San Marino. Each association could enter one team, the winners of their regular top domestic futsal league (or in special circumstances, the runners-up). Moreover, the winners of the 2015–16 UEFA Futsal Cup qualified automatically as title holders, and thus their association could enter a second team.

Teams were ranked according to their UEFA coefficients, computed based on results of the last three seasons, to decide on the round they entered. The top four teams (with the title holders being the automatic top seed) entered the elite round, the next 16 teams (ranked 5–20) entered the main round, and the bottom 32 teams (ranked 21–52) entered the preliminary round.

For teams entering the preliminary round or main round, they were assigned a seeding position according to their ranking for the respective draw, with eight teams pre-selected as hosts for the preliminary round and six teams pre-selected as hosts for the main round (marked by (H) below).

Rank	Association	Team	Qualified through	Coeff	Seed
Elite round
1	Russia	Ugra Yugorsk (Title holders)	2015–16 UEFA Futsal Cup	34.000	—
2	Kazakhstan	Kairat Almaty	2015–16 Kazakhstani Futsal Championship	50.333	—
3	Spain	Inter FS	2015–16 Primera División de Futsal	43.500	—
4	Russia	Dinamo Moskva	2015–16 Russian Futsal Super League	33.000	—
Main round
5	Portugal	Sporting CP	2015–16 Liga Portuguesa de Futsal	26.166	1
6	Azerbaijan	Araz Naxçivan	2015–16 Azerbaijan Futsal Premier League	20.501	1
7	Serbia	Ekonomac (H)	2015–16 Serbian Prva Futsal Liga	20.000	1
8	(Czech Republic) Czech Republic	EP Chrudim (H)	2015–16 Czech Futsal First League	19.001	1
9	Hungary	ETO Győr	2015–16 Futsal Nemzeti Bajnokság I	14.168	1
10	Latvia	Nikars Riga	2015–16 Latvian Futsal Premier League	12.500	1
11	Belarus	LSM Lida	2015–16 Belarusian Futsal Premier League	10.833	2
12	(North Macedonia) Macedonia	Železarec Skopje (H)	2015–16 Macedonian Futsal First League	9.501	2
13	Belgium	Halle-Gooik	2015–16 Belgian Futsal Division 1	9.000	2
14	Bulgaria	Grand Pro Varna (H)	2015–16 Bulgarian Premiere Futsal League	8.625	2
15	France	Kremlin-Bicêtre United	2015–16 Championnat de France de Futsal	8.500	2
16	Romania	City'US Târgu Mureș	2015–16 Futsal Liga I	6.834	2
17	Ukraine	Energia Lviv (H)	2015–16 Extra-Liga	6.834	3
18	Slovakia	Pinerola Bratislava	2015–16 Slovak Futsal Extraliga	6.500	3
19	Italy	Real Rieti (H)	2015–16 Futsal Serie A	6.334	3
20	Croatia	Nacional Zagreb	2015–16 Croatian Prva HMNL	5.501	3
Preliminary round
21	Cyprus	APOEL Nicosia	2015–16 Cypriot Futsal First Division	5.000	1
22	Greece	Athina 90	2015–16 Hellenic Futsal Premiere League	4.500	1
23	(Bosnia and Herzegovina) Bosnia and Herzegovina	Centar Sarajevo	2015–16 Premier Futsal League of Bosnia and Herzegovina	4.167	1
24	England	Oxford City Lions	2015–16 FA National Futsal League	3.834	1
25	Finland	Sievi Futsal (H)	2015–16 Futsal-Liiga	3.001	1
26	Germany	Hamburg Panthers	2015–16 DFB Futsal Cup	2.750	1
27	Netherlands	Amsterdam SV	2015–16 Topdivisie	2.667	1
28	Slovenia	Brezje Maribor (H)	2015–16 Slovenian Futsal League	2.500	1
29	(Georgia (country)) Georgia	Tbilisi State University	2015–16 Georgian Futsal League	1.834	2
30	Sweden	IFK Göteborg	2015–16 Swedish Futsal League	1.584	2
31	Denmark	JB Futsal Gentofte	2015–16 Danish Futsal Championship	1.250	2
32	Poland	Zduńska Wola	2015–16 Futsal Ekstraklasa	1.167	2
33	(Republic of Ireland) Republic of Ireland	Blue Magic FC Dublin	2015–16 Irish Futsal National League	1.083	2
34	Norway	Sandefjord	2015–16 NFF Futsal Eliteserie	1.083	2
35	Turkey	Istanbul Üniversitesi SK	2015–16 Turkish Futsal League	0.999	2
36	Andorra	FC Encamp (H)	2015–16 Futsal Primera Divisió	0.999	2
37	Moldova	Classic Chișinău (H)	2015–16 Moldovan Futsal National Division	0.875	3
38	Gibraltar	Lynx FC	2015–16 Gibraltarian Futsal League	0.834	3
39	Albania	KF Tirana	2015–16 Albanian Futsal Championship	0.750	3
40	Malta	Valletta FC	2015–16 Maltese Futsal Premier League	0.750	3
41	Montenegro	Military Futsal Team (H)	2015–16 Montenegrin Futsal First League	0.584	3
42	Austria	SC Kaiserebersdorf (H)	2015–16 Austrian Futsal Liga	0.584	3
43	Israel	ASA Tel Aviv	2015–16 Israeli Futsal League	0.500	3
44	Armenia	ASUE Futsal (H)	2015–16 Armenian Futsal Premier League	0.334	3
45	Switzerland	AFM Futsal Maniacs	2015–16 Swiss Futsal Championship	0.334	4
46	Estonia	FC Cosmos	2015–16 Saalijalgpalli Meistriliiga	0.250	4
47	Lithuania	FC Baltija (H)	2015–16 Lithuanian Futsal Championship	0.167	4
48	Wales	Cardiff University Futsal Club	2015–16 Wales Futsal League	0.000	4
49	Scotland	Wattcell Futsal Club	2015–16 Scottish Futsal League	0.000	4
50	Luxembourg	FC Munsbach	2015–16 Luxembourg Futsal League	0.000	4
51	Kosovo	FC Feniks	2015–16 Kosovo Futsal League	0.000	4
52	(San Marino) San Marino	Tre Fiori	2015–16 Campionato Sammarinese di Futsal	0.000	4

Did not enter
(Faroe Islands) Faroe Islands
Iceland
Liechtenstein
(Northern Ireland) Northern Ireland

The draws for the preliminary round and main round were held on 7 July 2016, 14:00 CEST (UTC+2), at the UEFA headquarters in Nyon, Switzerland. The mechanism of the draws for each round was as follows:

- In the preliminary round, the 32 teams were drawn into eight groups of four containing one team from each of the seeding positions 1–4. First, the eight teams which were pre-selected as hosts were drawn from their own designated pot and allocated to their respective group as per their seeding positions. Next, the remaining 24 teams were drawn from their respective pot which were allocated according to their seeding positions.
- In the main round, the 24 teams were drawn into six groups of four, either containing one team from each of the seeding positions 1–3 and one group winner from the preliminary round, or containing one team from each of the seeding positions 1–2 and two group winners from the preliminary round. First, the six teams which were pre-selected as hosts were drawn from their own designated pot and allocated to their respective group as per their seeding positions. Next, the remaining 18 teams (including the eight preliminary round winners, whose identity was not known at the time of the draw) were drawn from their respective pot which were allocated according to their seeding positions.

Based on the decisions taken by the UEFA Emergency Panel, teams from Azerbaijan/Armenia, Kosovo/Serbia, and Kosovo/Bosnia and Herzegovina would not be drawn into the same group. Should any of the above teams win their preliminary round group and qualify for a main round group with a team they cannot play against, they would be swapped with the next available team in their seeding position following the alphabetical order of the groups.

== Round and draw dates ==
The schedule of the competition is as follows.

Round	Draw	Dates
Preliminary round	7 July 2016	16–21 August 2016
Main round	7 July 2016	11–16 October 2016
Elite round	21 October 2016	22–27 November 2016
Final tournament	4 March 2017	Semi-finals: 28 April 2017; Third place match & Final: 30 April 2017

== Format ==
In the preliminary round, main round and elite round, each group is played as a round-robin mini-tournament at the pre-selected hosts.

In the final tournament, the four qualified teams play in knockout format (semi-finals, third place match, and final), either at a host selected by UEFA from one of the teams, or at a neutral venue.

=== Tiebreakers ===
In the preliminary round, main round and elite round, the teams are ranked according to points (3 points for a win, 1 point for a draw, 0 points for a loss). If two or more teams are equal on points on completion of a mini-tournament, the following tie-breaking criteria are applied, in the order given, to determine the rankings (regulations Articles 14.01 and 14.02):

1. Higher number of points obtained in the mini-tournament matches played among the teams in question;
2. Superior goal difference resulting from the mini-tournament matches played among the teams in question;
3. Higher number of goals scored in the mini-tournament matches played among the teams in question;
4. If, after having applied criteria 1 to 3, teams still have an equal ranking, criteria 1 to 3 are reapplied exclusively to the mini-tournament matches between the teams in question to determine their final rankings. If this procedure does not lead to a decision, criteria 5 to 10 apply;
5. Superior goal difference in all mini-tournament matches;
6. Higher number of goals scored in all mini-tournament matches;
7. If only two teams have the same number of points, and they are tied according to criteria 1 to 6 after having met in the last round of the mini-tournament, their rankings are determined by a penalty shoot-out (not used if more than two teams had the same number of points, or if their rankings are not relevant for qualification for the next stage).
8. Lower disciplinary points total based only on yellow and red cards received in the mini-tournament matches (red card = 3 points, yellow card = 1 point, expulsion for two yellow cards in one match = 3 points);
9. Coefficient ranking;
10. Drawing of lots.

== Preliminary round ==
The eight group winners advanced to the main round to join the 16 teams which received byes to the main round.

All times were CEST (UTC+2).

=== Group A ===
Pos	Team	Pld	W	D	L	GF	GA	GD	Pts	Qualification
1	(Cyprus) APOEL Nicosia	3	2	1	0	20	17	+3	7	Main round
2	(Denmark) JB Futsal Gentofte	3	2	0	1	17	10	+7	6	
3	(Armenia) ASUE Futsal (H)	3	1	1	1	14	15	−1	4	
4	(Switzerland) AFM Futsal Maniacs	3	0	0	3	11	20	−9	0	

Source: UEFA
Rules for classification: Tiebreakers
(H) Hosts
17 August 2016
14:00

APOEL Nicosia (Cyprus)	9–7	(Switzerland) AFM Futsal Maniacs
Christodoulou 16', 29'; Nenê 18', 18', 19', 24', 28'; Carrasco 39'; Lakoufis 39'	Report	Federico 6', 30', 40' (pen.), 40'; M. Facchinetti 15' (pen.); A. Facchinetti 16', 16'

Yerevan Football Academy, Yerevan
Referee: Grigori Zelentsov (Russia), Kreshnik Hakrama (Albania)
17 August 2016
17:00

ASUE Futsal (Armenia)	4–6	(Denmark) JB Futsal Gentofte
Andreasyan 11'; Galstyan 27'; Baghdadyan 28'; Karapetyan 37'	Report	Jørgensen 5'; Falck 7'; Agger 11'; Larsen 21'; Jensen 23'; Veis 36'

Yerevan Football Academy, Yerevan
Referee: Fredric Nilholt (Sweden), Ingus Puriņš (Latvia)

18 August 2016
14:00

JB Futsal Gentofte (Denmark)	3–4	(Cyprus) APOEL Nicosia
Veis 6'; Birkedal 24'; Jørgensen 29'	Report	Nenê 19', 37'; Carrasco 23', 27'

Yerevan Football Academy, Yerevan
Referee: Ingus Puriņš (Latvia), Grigori Zelentsov (Russia)
18 August 2016
17:00

ASUE Futsal (Armenia)	3–2	(Switzerland) AFM Futsal Maniacs
Capozzolo 5' (o.g.); Dokmanyan 10', 36'	Report	Farias De Almeida 15'; M. Facchinetti 31'

Yerevan Football Academy, Yerevan
Referee: Kreshnik Hakrama (Albania), Fredric Nilholt (Sweden)

20 August 2016
14:00

AFM Futsal Maniacs (Switzerland)	2–8	(Denmark) JB Futsal Gentofte
Krause 1'; Capozzolo 6'	Report	Badran 16', 39'; Falck 26'; Jørgensen 26', 35', 38'; Kudsk 29'; Agger 34'

Yerevan Football Academy, Yerevan
Referee: Ingus Puriņš (Latvia), Kreshnik Hakrama (Albania)
20 August 2016
17:00

APOEL Nicosia (Cyprus)	7–7	(Armenia) ASUE Futsal
Christodoulou 12', 17', 39'; Leo Feitoza 14'; Nenê 26'; Lakoufis 28'; Karapetyan 33' (o.g.)	Report	Baghdadyan 17'; Karapetyan 17', 36' (pen.); Sargsyan 24'; Mikayelyan 25', 34'; Dokmanyan 30'

Yerevan Football Academy, Yerevan
Referee: Grigori Zelentsov (Russia), Fredric Nilholt (Sweden)

=== Group B ===
Pos	Team	Pld	W	D	L	GF	GA	GD	Pts	Qualification
1	(Greece) Athina 90	3	3	0	0	14	10	+4	9	Main round
2	(Montenegro) Military Futsal Team (H)	3	2	0	1	14	8	+6	6	
3	(Republic of Ireland) Blue Magic FC Dublin	3	0	1	2	6	10	−4	1	
4	(San Marino) Tre Fiori	3	0	1	2	5	11	−6	1	

Source: UEFA
Rules for classification: Tiebreakers
(H) Hosts
16 August 2016
18:00

Athina 90 (Greece)	3–2	(San Marino) Tre Fiori
Ntovletakis 14'; Papadopoulos 17'; Ntarlas 23'	Report	Busignani 12'; Ercolani 20'

Morača Sports Center, Podgorica
Referee: Alejandro Martínez Flores (Spain), Mário Belavý (Slovakia)
16 August 2016
20:30

Military Futsal Team (Montenegro)	3–1	(Republic of Ireland) Blue Magic FC Dublin
Đoković 17'; Lakčević 32'; Barović 35'	Report	Paszkiewiccz 10'

Morača Sports Center, Podgorica
Referee: Marco Rothenfluh (Switzerland), Omar Rafiq (Norway)

17 August 2016
18:00

Blue Magic FC Dublin (Republic of Ireland)	2–4	(Greece) Athina 90
Begaj 13' (o.g.); Adamczyk 34'	Report	Ntovletakis 18'; Begaj 32'; Ntarlas 36'; Papadopoulos 38'

Morača Sports Center, Podgorica
Referee: Mário Belavý (Slovakia), Marco Rothenfluh (Switzerland)
17 August 2016
20:30

Military Futsal Team (Montenegro)	5–0	(San Marino) Tre Fiori
Lakčević 6'; Il. Mugoša 8', 27'; Barović 17'; Jakšić 37'	Report

Morača Sports Center, Podgorica
Referee: Omar Rafiq (Norway), Alejandro Martínez Flores (Spain)

19 August 2016
18:00

Tre Fiori (San Marino)	3–3	(Republic of Ireland) Blue Magic FC Dublin
Busignani 13'; Macina 15'; Longoni 39'	Report	Radziwoniuk 2'; Paszkiewiccz 3'; Pospula 24'

Morača Sports Center, Podgorica
Referee: Omar Rafiq (Norway), Mário Belavý (Slovakia)
19 August 2016
20:30

Athina 90 (Greece)	7–6	(Montenegro) Military Futsal Team
Ntarlas 7'; Papadopoulos 7', 15', 25', 38'; Chouchoumis 16', 27'	Report	M. Bajčetić 10'; Radulović 20'; Đoković 29'; Lakčević 30'; Barović 39'; Jakšić 40'

Morača Sports Center, Podgorica
Referee: Alejandro Martínez Flores (Spain), Marco Rothenfluh (Switzerland)

=== Group C ===
Pos	Team	Pld	W	D	L	GF	GA	GD	Pts	Qualification
1	(Germany) Hamburg Panthers	3	2	1	0	12	6	+6	7	Main round
2	(Moldova) Classic Chișinău (H)	3	1	1	1	5	6	−1	4	
3	(Norway) Sandefjord	3	0	3	0	8	8	0	3	
4	(Wales) Cardiff University Futsal Club	3	0	1	2	6	11	−5	1	

Source: UEFA
Rules for classification: Tiebreakers
(H) Hosts
18 August 2016
15:00

Hamburg Panthers (Germany)	6–2	(Wales) Cardiff University Futsal Club
Labiadh 3', 14'; Winkel 8', 16'; Khalili 28'; Meyer 37'	Report	Zulkarnain 5'; Hugh 21'

FMF Arena, Ciorescu
Referee: Vitali Rakutski (Belarus), Yusif Nurullayev (Azerbaijan)
18 August 2016
17:30

Classic Chișinău (Moldova)	2–2	(Norway) Sandefjord
Nicolaiciuc 4', 38'	Report	Devig 8'; Flatoy 36'

FMF Futsal Arena, Ciorescu
Referee: Olli Niemelä (Finland), Sabit Selvi (Turkey)

19 August 2016
15:00

Sandefjord (Norway)	2–2	(Germany) Hamburg Panthers
Matern 7' (o.g.); Espegren 15'	Report	Labiadh 20'; Meyer 21'

FMF Futsal Arena, Ciorescu
Referee: Sabit Selvi (Turkey), Olli Niemelä (Finland)
19 August 2016
17:30

Classic Chișinău (Moldova)	1–0	(Wales) Cardiff University Futsal Club
Hoderean 37'	Report

FMF Futsal Arena, Ciorescu
Referee: Yusif Nurullayev (Azerbaijan), Vitali Rakutski (Belarus)

21 August 2016
15:00

Cardiff University Futsal Club (Wales)	4–4	(Norway) Sandefjord
Hugh 1'; Hooper 5'; Zulkarnain 8'; Prangley 38'	Report	Anthonisen 17'; Espegren 19', 34', 37'

FMF Futsal Arena, Ciorescu
Referee: Yusif Nurullayev (Azerbaijan), Sabit Selvi (Turkey)
21 August 2016
17:30

Hamburg Panthers (Germany)	4–2	(Moldova) Classic Chișinău
Matern 5'; Winkel 20', 38'; Labiadh 27'	Report	Iacovenco 25', 34'

FMF Futsal Arena, Ciorescu
Referee: Vitali Rakutski (Belarus), Olli Niemelä (Finland)

=== Group D ===
Pos	Team	Pld	W	D	L	GF	GA	GD	Pts	Qualification
1	(Bosnia and Herzegovina) Centar Sarajevo	3	3	0	0	22	7	+15	9	Main round
2	(Lithuania) FC Baltija (H)	3	2	0	1	11	9	+2	6	
3	(Turkey) Istanbul Üniversitesi SK	3	1	0	2	14	19	−5	3	
4	(Gibraltar) Lynx FC	3	0	0	3	9	21	−12	0	

Source: UEFA
Rules for classification: Tiebreakers
(H) Hosts
17 August 2016
16:15

Centar Sarajevo (Bosnia and Herzegovina)	9–3	(Gibraltar) Lynx FC
Jusić 1'; Mršo 13', 18', 40'; Kahvedžić 14'; Christian Sanchez 16' (o.g.); Radmilović 23', 25'; Handžić 31'	Report	J. Duarte 10'; Cancio 38'; Martin 40'

Cido Arena, Panevėžys
Referee: Valentin Ciuplea (Wales), Stefan Vrijens (Belgium)
17 August 2016
18:30

FC Baltija (Lithuania)	6–3	(Turkey) Istanbul Üniversitesi SK
Šteinas 2'; Švelna 9', 31'; Baranauskas 20', 33'; Jeremejev 20'	Report	Onur Mengi 21'; Burak Işıkay 36'; Yiğitcan Yenilmez 37'

Cido Arena, Panevėžys
Referee: Simon Todorovič (Slovenia), Norbert Szilágyi (Hungary)

18 August 2016
16:15

Istanbul Üniversitesi SK (Turkey)	3–9	(Bosnia and Herzegovina) Centar Sarajevo
Talha Can Vardar 1', 35'; Özgür Candaş Gezener 2'	Report	Radmilović 1', 34'; Kahvedžić 2', 17', 24'; Yunus Erman Hizli 14' (o.g.); Đuderija 20', 38'; D. Novoselac 40'

Cido Arena, Panevėžys
Referee: Stefan Vrijens (Belgium), Simon Todorovič (Slovenia)
18 August 2016
18:30

FC Baltija (Lithuania)	4–2	(Gibraltar) Lynx FC
Šteinas 20', 32'; Baranauskas 22'; Švelna 25'	Report	Christian Sanchez 34'; Cancio 35'

Cido Arena, Panevėžys
Referee: Norbert Szilágyi (Hungary), Valentin Ciuplea (Wales)

20 August 2016
11:15

Lynx FC (Gibraltar)	4–8	(Turkey) Istanbul Üniversitesi SK
Martin 5', 17', 24'; Fernandez 38'	Report	Ferhat Aşik 8'; Özgür Candaş Gezener 12', 38'; Yunus Erman Hizli 20'; Muhammet Altunay 22', 23', 35'; Enes Bayraktar 25'

Cido Arena, Panevėžys
Referee: Norbert Szilágyi (Hungary), Stefan Vrijens (Belgium)
20 August 2016
13:30

Centar Sarajevo (Bosnia and Herzegovina)	4–1	(Lithuania) FC Baltija
Sipović 13'; Radmilović 35', 38'; D. Novoselac 36' (pen.)	Report	Jeremejev 26'

Cido Arena, Panevėžys
Referee: Simon Todorovič (Slovenia), Valentin Ciuplea (Wales)

=== Group E ===
Pos	Team	Pld	W	D	L	GF	GA	GD	Pts	Qualification
1	(Sweden) IFK Göteborg	3	3	0	0	7	4	+3	9	Main round
2	(Netherlands) Amsterdam SV	3	2	0	1	18	9	+9	6	
3	(Austria) SC Kaiserebersdorf (H)	3	1	0	2	8	9	−1	3	
4	(Estonia) FC Cosmos	3	0	0	3	5	16	−11	0	

Source: UEFA
Rules for classification: Tiebreakers
(H) Hosts
17 August 2016
18:00

Amsterdam SV (Netherlands)	11–2	(Estonia) FC Cosmos
Neil 7', 10'; Aklalouch 11', 40'; El Morabiti 19', 32', 36', 36', 39'; Makraou 20'; Makraou 26'	Report	Grigorjev 1'; Jermilins 28'

Sporthalle Brigittenau, Vienna
Referee: Damian Jaruchiewicz (Poland), Kaloyan Kirilov (Bulgaria)
17 August 2016
20:15

SC Kaiserebersdorf (Austria)	1–2	(Sweden) IFK Göteborg
Filipović 11'	Report	Rossi 6'; Melin 31'

Sporthalle Brigittenau, Vienna
Referee: Damir Radović (Serbia), Clinton Mario Cassar (Malta)

18 August 2016
18:00

IFK Göteborg (Sweden)	3–2	(Netherlands) Amsterdam SV
Rossi 7', 10'; Stefansson 32'	Report	Neil 1'; Hoogewoning 40'

Sporthalle Brigittenau, Vienna
Referee: Kaloyan Kirilov (Bulgaria), Damir Radović (Serbia)
18 August 2016
20:15

SC Kaiserebersdorf (Austria)	3–2	(Estonia) FC Cosmos
Andjelić 13'; Nastasijević 14'; Jevremović 31'	Report	Grigorjev 24'; Šrubkovski 40'

Sporthalle Brigittenau, Vienna
Referee: Clinton Mario Cassar (Malta), Damian Jaruchiewicz (Poland)

20 August 2016
18:00

FC Cosmos (Estonia)	1–2	(Sweden) IFK Göteborg
Grigorjev 26'	Report	Solberg 39', 40'

Sporthalle Brigittenau, Vienna
Referee: Damir Radović (Serbia), Clinton Mario Cassar (Malta)
20 August 2016
20:15

Amsterdam SV (Netherlands)	5–4	(Austria) SC Kaiserebersdorf
Ritfeld 8', 22', 33'; Makraou 13', 25'	Report	Ilić 2'; Andjelić 29', 30', 39'

Sporthalle Brigittenau, Vienna
Referee: Damian Jaruchiewicz (Poland), Kaloyan Kirilov (Bulgaria)

=== Group F ===
Pos	Team	Pld	W	D	L	GF	GA	GD	Pts	Qualification
1	(Georgia (country)) Tbilisi State University	3	3	0	0	23	8	+15	9	Main round
2	(Finland) Sievi Futsal (H)	3	2	0	1	24	11	+13	6	
3	(Malta) Valletta FC	3	1	0	2	12	16	−4	3	
4	(Scotland) Wattcell Futsal Club	3	0	0	3	10	34	−24	0	

Source: UEFA
Rules for classification: Tiebreakers
(H) Hosts
17 August 2016
15:30

Tbilisi State University (Georgia (country))	12–4	(Scotland) Wattcell Futsal Club
Chanukvadze 1'; Maisaia 6'; Murtskhvaladze 8'; Bobokhidze 10'; Sigunava 16', 39', 40'; Kobaidze 17'; Kurtanidze 20'; Shelegia 29'; Sebiskveradze 38', 40'	Report	Donnelly 26', 38', 38'; Muhsin 37' (pen.)

Ylivieska Ice Arena, Ylivieska
Referee: Andrej Topić (Croatia), Talgat Kosmukhambetov (Kazakhstan)
17 August 2016
18:00

Sievi Futsal (Finland)	7–3	(Malta) Valletta FC
Tirkkonen 9', 11', 14', 29'; Hosio 10' (pen.); Pakola 19'; Väinälä 22'	Report	Milijic 6'; Saliba 11'; Kaca 29'

Ylivieska Ice Arena, Ylivieska
Referee: Viktor Bugenko (Moldova), Igor Puzović (Bosnia and Herzegovina)

18 August 2016
15:30

Valletta FC (Malta)	0–6	(Georgia (country)) Tbilisi State University
	Report	Bobokhidze 18', 38'; Sebiskveradze 22' (pen.); Chanukvadze 22'; Kurtsadze 27'; Kurtanidze 33'

Ylivieska Ice Arena, Ylivieska
Referee: Talgat Kosmukhambetov (Kazakhstan), Viktor Bugenko (Moldova)
18 August 2016
18:00

Sievi Futsal (Finland)	13–3	(Scotland) Wattcell Futsal Club
Erceg 8', 12', 24'; Tirkkonen 12', 19' (pen.), 31', 37'; Hosio 15', 28', 30', 30'; Junno 25', 29'	Report	Donnelly 7', 21'; Malin 20'

Ylivieska Ice Arena, Ylivieska
Referee: Igor Puzović (Bosnia and Herzegovina), Andrej Topić (Croatia)

20 August 2016
12:30

Wattcell Futsal Club (Scotland)	3–9	(Malta) Valletta FC
McIntosh 20'; Donnelly 31', 40'	Report	Musu 2'; Milijic 4'; Cardona 8', 31'; Di Maio 17'; Augusto 25'; Kaca 32'; Cuadros Silva 39', 40'

Ylivieska Ice Arena, Ylivieska
Referee: Talgat Kosmukhambetov (Kazakhstan), Igor Puzović (Bosnia and Herzegovina)
20 August 2016
15:00

Tbilisi State University (Georgia (country))	5–4	(Finland) Sievi Futsal
Kakabadze 11'; Shelegia 13'; Bobokhidze 14'; Sebiskveradze 27'; Chanukvadze 28'	Report	Junno 7'; Tirkkonen 13'; Pakola 23', 33'

Ylivieska Ice Arena, Ylivieska
Referee: Andrej Topić (Croatia), Viktor Bugenko (Moldova)

=== Group G ===
Pos	Team	Pld	W	D	L	GF	GA	GD	Pts	Qualification
1	(Slovenia) Brezje Maribor (H)	3	3	0	0	24	8	+16	9	Main round
2	(Poland) Zduńska Wola	3	2	0	1	22	13	+9	6	
3	(Luxembourg) FC Munsbach	3	1	0	2	11	25	−14	3	
4	(Albania) KF Tirana	3	0	0	3	6	17	−11	0	

Source: UEFA
Rules for classification: Tiebreakers
(H) Hosts
17 August 2016
18:00

Zduńska Wola (Poland)	10–4	(Luxembourg) FC Munsbach
Kielpiński 3', 22'; Sobalczyk 5', 31', 37'; Marciniak 9', 22', 38'; Słowiński 20'; Milewski 31'	Report	Ricardo Correia 19' (pen.); Carlos Soares 26'; Wilson Marques 32'; Steve Da Silva 36'

Tabor Hall, Maribor
Referee: Ruben Guerreiro (Portugal), Yiangos Yiangou (Cyprus)
17 August 2016
20:30

Brezje Maribor (Slovenia)	4–2	(Albania) KF Tirana
Čeh 6', 20'; Totošković 23'; Klinc 29'	Report	Selmanaj 16'; Nikolli 40'

Tabor Hall, Maribor
Referee: Marjan Mladenovski (Macedonia), David Berry (Republic of Ireland)

18 August 2016
18:00

KF Tirana (Albania)	3–8	(Poland) Zduńska Wola
Gockaj 18'; Hoxha 19'; Çela 34'	Report	Marciniak 11'; Olczak 13'; Milewski 16', 19', 36'; Szczypczyński 29'; Hoxha 33' (o.g.); Sobalczyk 37'

Tabor Hall, Maribor
Referee: David Berry (Republic of Ireland), Marjan Mladenovski (Macedonia)
18 August 2016
20:30

Brezje Maribor (Slovenia)	14–2	(Luxembourg) FC Munsbach
Fetić 1', 13'; Totošković 2', 11', 35'; Jandrić 5', 12', 20'; Fideršek 17', 17'; Klinc 30', 30'; Hasanbegović 34'; Škorić 39'	Report	Ricardo Correia 9' (pen.); Rafael Dos Reis 26'

Tabor Hall, Maribor
Referee: Yiangos Yiangou (Cyprus), Ruben Guerreiro (Portugal)

20 August 2016
18:00

FC Munsbach (Luxembourg)	5–1	(Albania) KF Tirana
Steve Da Silva 4'; Fabio Gaspar 28', 29'; Ricardo Correia 29'; Pedro Marinho 36'	Report	Selmanaj 24'

Tabor Hall, Maribor
Referee: David Berry (Republic of Ireland), Yiangos Yiangou (Cyprus)
20 August 2016
20:30

Zduńska Wola (Poland)	4–6	(Slovenia) Brezje Maribor
Krawczyk 7', 9', 26', 40'	Report	Čeh 8'; Totošković 20'; Hasanbegović 28'; Fideršek 29'; Fetić 36', 38'

Tabor Hall, Maribor
Referee: Ruben Guerreiro (Portugal), Marjan Mladenovski (Macedonia)

=== Group H ===
Pos	Team	Pld	W	D	L	GF	GA	GD	Pts	Qualification
1	(Kosovo) FC Feniks	3	3	0	0	21	2	+19	9	Main round
2	(England) Oxford City Lions	3	2	0	1	13	5	+8	6	
3	(Israel) ASA Tel Aviv	3	1	0	2	2	12	−10	3	
4	(Andorra) FC Encamp (H)	3	0	0	3	3	20	−17	0	

Source: UEFA
Rules for classification: Tiebreakers
(H) Hosts
17 August 2016
18:00

Oxford City Lions (England)	2–3	(Kosovo) FC Feniks
Antoñito 11'; David Parente 27'	Report	A. Brahimi 12'; Alibegu 15'; Marcelo 36'

Centre Esportiu Serradells, Andorra la Vella
Referee: Lars Van Leeuwen (Netherlands), Daniele Di Resta (Italy)
17 August 2016
20:30

FC Encamp (Andorra)	1–2	(Israel) ASA Tel Aviv
Cabinho 7'	Report	Buda 5', 25'

Centre Esportiu Serradells, Andorra la Vella
Referee: Jan Kresta (Czech Republic), Ovidiu Dan Curta (Romania)

18 August 2016
18:00

ASA Tel Aviv (Israel)	0–5	(England) Oxford City Lions
	Report	David Parente 5'; Palfreeman 19', 21'; Nerín 37'; Pepe Casasola 40'

Centre Esportiu Serradells, Andorra la Vella
Referee: Ovidiu Dan Curta (Romania), Jan Kresta (Czech Republic)
18 August 2016
20:30

FC Encamp (Andorra)	0–12	(Kosovo) FC Feniks
	Report	Ramadani 7', 39'; Alibegu 8', 18', 27'; Belej 11', 31'; Rodek 14', 28'; Shp. Brahimi 20', 25'; Lopez Garrido 25' (o.g.)

Centre Esportiu Serradells, Andorra la Vella
Referee: Daniele Di Resta (Italy), Lars Van Leeuwen (Netherlands)

20 August 2016
18:00

FC Feniks (Kosovo)	6–0	(Israel) ASA Tel Aviv
Marcelo 17'; Rodek 22', 29'; Belej 23'; Ramadani 37'; Topilla 40'	Report

Centre Esportiu Serradells, Andorra la Vella
Referee: Lars Van Leeuwen (Netherlands), Daniele Di Resta (Italy)
20 August 2016
20:30

Oxford City Lions (England)	6–2	(Andorra) FC Encamp
Jimenez 2'; Palfreeman 14', 38'; David Parente 15', 37', 39' (pen.)	Report	Cabinho 24'; Raventós 38'

Centre Esportiu Serradells, Andorra la Vella
Referee: Jan Kresta (Czech Republic), Ovidiu Dan Curta (Romania)

== Main round ==
The six group winners and the six group runners-up advanced to the elite round to join the four teams which received byes to the elite round.

All times were CEST (UTC+2).

=== Group 1 ===
Pos	Team	Pld	W	D	L	GF	GA	GD	Pts	Qualification
1	(Hungary) ETO Győr	3	3	0	0	17	5	+12	9	Elite round
2	(Slovenia) Brezje Maribor	3	1	0	2	7	8	−1	3	Elite round
3	(Ukraine) Energia Lviv (H)	3	1	0	2	8	10	−2	3	
4	(France) Kremlin-Bicêtre United	3	1	0	2	6	15	−9	3	

Source: UEFA
Rules for classification: Tiebreakers
(H) Hosts
12 October 2016
14:00

ETO Győr (Hungary)	4–0	(Slovenia) Brezje Maribor
Drahovský 19', 22'; Jaison 25' (pen.); Moura 31'	Report

Sports Palace Galychyna, Lviv
Referee: Gerald Bauernfeind (Austria), Peter Nurse (England)
12 October 2016
17:00

Energia Lviv (Ukraine)	4–1	(France) Kremlin-Bicêtre United
Ba 16' (o.g.); Kordoba 17'; Kuz 27'; Lehendzevych 38'	Report	Belhaj 12'

Sports Palace Galychyna, Lviv
Referee: Gabriel Gherman (Romania), Lukáš Peško(Slovakia)

13 October 2016
14:00

Kremlin-Bicêtre United (France)	3–10	(Hungary) ETO Győr
De Souza Franco 20'; Da Silva 33'; Aigoun 36'	Report	Seidler 1', 6'; Álex 2', 22'; Drahovský 4', 28'; Jaison 9'; Vas 16'; Sáhó 32'; Moura 36'

Sports Palace Galychyna, Lviv
Referee: Peter Nurse (England), Gabriel Gherman (Romania)
13 October 2016
17:00

Energia Lviv (Ukraine)	2–6	(Slovenia) Brezje Maribor
Lehendzevych 21', 28'	Report	Totošković 6', 9', 38'; Fideršek 13'; Fetić 25', 32'

Sports Palace Galychyna, Lviv
Referee: Lukáš Peško (Slovakia), Gerald Bauernfeind (Austria)

15 October 2016
14:00

Brezje Maribor (Slovenia)	1–2	(France) Kremlin-Bicêtre United
Hasanbegović 5'	Report	De Souza Franco 29'; Da Silva 39'

Sports Palace Galychyna, Lviv
Referee: Peter Nurse (England), Gabriel Gherman (Romania)
15 October 2016
17:00

ETO Győr (Hungary)	3–2	(Ukraine) Energia Lviv
Seidler 5', 30'; Jaison 37'	Report	Mykola Grytsyna 9'; Kuz 31'

Sports Palace Galychyna, Lviv
Referee: Gerald Bauernfeind (Austria), Lukáš Peško (Slovakia)

=== Group 2 ===
Pos	Team	Pld	W	D	L	GF	GA	GD	Pts	Qualification
1	(Azerbaijan) Araz Naxçivan	3	3	0	0	23	5	+18	9	Elite round
2	(Kosovo) FC Feniks	3	2	0	1	12	4	+8	6	Elite round
3	(Georgia (country)) Tbilisi State University	3	1	0	2	14	14	0	3	
4	(North Macedonia) Železarec Skopje (H)	3	0	0	3	4	30	−26	0	

Source: UEFA
Rules for classification: Tiebreakers
(H) Hosts
11 October 2016
17:30

Araz Naxçivan (Azerbaijan)	7–1	(Georgia (country)) Tbilisi State University
Everton Cardoso 4', 12'; Vassoura 30' (pen.), 36'; Bolinha 38', 39'; Baghirov 39'	Report	Sozashvili 24'

Boris Trajkovski Sports Center, Skopje
Referee: Borislav Kolev (Bulgaria), Simon Todorovič (Slovenia)
11 October 2016
20:00

Železarec Skopje (North Macedonia)	0–5	(Kosovo) FC Feniks
	Report	Marcelo 12', 18'; Alibegu 14'; Mejzini 22', 30'

Boris Trajkovski Sports Center, Skopje
Referee: Moshe Bohbot (Israel), Vasilios Christodoulis (Greece)

12 October 2016
17:30

FC Feniks (Kosovo)	0–1	(Azerbaijan) Araz Naxçivan
	Report	Baghirov 11'

Boris Trajkovski Sports Center, Skopje
Referee: Simon Todorovič (Slovenia), Moshe Bohbot (Israel)
12 October 2016
20:00

Železarec Skopje (North Macedonia)	0–10	(Georgia (country)) Tbilisi State University
	Report	Sebiskveradze 7', 10', 36'; Kurtanidze 13', 21'; Tophuria 21', 37'; Bobokhidze 25'; Sigunava 28'; Krstevski 35' (o.g.)

Boris Trajkovski Sports Center, Skopje
Referee: Vasilios Christodoulis (Greece), Borislav Kolev (Bulgaria)

14 October 2016
13:00

Tbilisi State University (Georgia (country))	3–7	(Kosovo) FC Feniks
Lukava 14'; Sozashvili 35'; Sebiskveradze 38'	Report	Mejzini 8', 24'; Victor Vieira 10'; A. Brahimi 17', 29', 35'; Alibegu 38'

Boris Trajkovski Sports Center, Skopje
Referee: Simon Todorovič (Slovenia), Moshe Bohbot (Israel)
14 October 2016
15:30

Araz Naxçivan (Azerbaijan)	15–4	(North Macedonia) Železarec Skopje
Bolinha 2', 6', 14', 16', 18', 36'; Atayev 11', 26', 39'; Chovdarov 19', 20'; Vassoura 23', 35'; Baghirov 27', 38'	Report	Stojanovski 5'; Stojmenov 28'; Lekić 33'; Krstevski 33'

Boris Trajkovski Sports Center, Skopje
Referee: Vasilios Christodoulis (Greece), Borislav Kolev (Bulgaria)

=== Group 3 ===
Pos	Team	Pld	W	D	L	GF	GA	GD	Pts	Qualification
1	(Latvia) Nikars Riga	3	3	0	0	12	4	+8	9	Elite round
2	(Germany) Hamburg Panthers	3	2	0	1	10	12	−2	6	Elite round
3	(Sweden) IFK Göteborg	3	1	0	2	11	14	−3	3	
4	(Bulgaria) Grand Pro Varna (H)	3	0	0	3	10	13	−3	0	

Source: UEFA
Rules for classification: Tiebreakers
(H) Hosts
12 October 2016
17:00

Nikars Riga (Latvia)	5–2	(Sweden) IFK Göteborg
Koļesņikovs 9'; Seņs 9', 16', 22'; Wanderson 11'	Report	Mönell 31', 37'

Palace of Culture and Sports, Varna
Attendance: 100
Referee: Timo Onatsu (Finland), Veljko Bošković (Montenegro)
12 October 2016
19:30

Grand Pro Varna (Bulgaria)	4–5	(Germany) Hamburg Panthers
Kostić 32', 34'; Karageorgiev 35'; Meyer 36' (o.g.)	Report	Winkel 12', 24'; Khalili 17'; Labiadh 24'; Ulusoy 36'

Palace of Culture and Sports, Varna
Attendance: 250
Referee: Nikola Jelić (Croatia), Barry Weijers (Netherlands)

13 October 2016
17:00

Hamburg Panthers (Germany)	1–5	(Latvia) Nikars Riga
Meyer 12'	Report	Koļesņikovs 4'; Seņs 23'; Wanderson 31'; Ewerton 31'; Astrahancevs 35'

Palace of Culture and Sports, Varna
Attendance: 100
Referee: Barry Weijers (Netherlands), Timo Onatsu (Finland)
13 October 2016
19:30

Grand Pro Varna (Bulgaria)	5–6	(Sweden) IFK Göteborg
Karageorgiev 7', 8'; Kostić 19', 33'; Gerenski 27'	Report	Bejan 20'; Melin 29', 31'; Mönell 32'; Eteus 37', 40'

Palace of Culture and Sports, Varna
Attendance: 250
Referee: Veljko Bošković (Montenegro), Nikola Jelić (Croatia)

15 October 2016
17:00

IFK Göteborg (Sweden)	3–4	(Germany) Hamburg Panthers
Mönell 29', 35'; Eteus 29'	Report	Labiadh 3'; Schröder 30'; Winkel 37'; Ulusoy 40'

Palace of Culture and Sports, Varna
Attendance: 50
Referee: Timo Onatsu (Finland), Nikola Jelić (Croatia)
15 October 2016
19:30

Nikars Riga (Latvia)	2–1	(Bulgaria) Grand Pro Varna
Gerasimov 24' (o.g.); Seņs 35'	Report	Gerasimov 16'

Palace of Culture and Sports, Varna
Attendance: 150
Referee: Veljko Bošković (Montenegro), Barry Weijers (Netherlands)

=== Group 4 ===
Pos	Team	Pld	W	D	L	GF	GA	GD	Pts	Qualification
1	(Serbia) Ekonomac (H)	3	3	0	0	11	3	+8	9	Elite round
2	(Croatia) Nacional Zagreb	3	2	0	1	8	5	+3	6	Elite round
3	(Belarus) LSM Lida	3	1	0	2	3	3	0	3	
4	(Greece) Athina 90	3	0	0	3	3	14	−11	0	

Source: UEFA
Rules for classification: Tiebreakers
(H) Hosts
12 October 2016
18:00

LSM Lida (Belarus)	3–1	(Greece) Athina 90
Ivanov 1'; Kolb 13'; Zhigalko 40'	Report	Chouchoumis 32'

Jezero Hall, Kragujevac
Referee: Elchin Samadli (Azerbaijan), David Schaerli (Switzerland)
12 October 2016
20:30

Ekonomac (Serbia)	5–1	(Croatia) Nacional Zagreb
Borisov 5', 39'; Valenko 34'; Matijević 38'; Rnić 38'	Report	Novak 22'

Jezero Hall, Kragujevac
Referee: Tomasz Frąk (Poland), Nuno Bogalho (Portugal)

13 October 2016
18:00

Nacional Zagreb (Croatia)	1–0	(Belarus) LSM Lida
Perić 33'	Report

Jezero Hall, Kragujevac
Referee: Tomasz Frąk (Poland), Elchin Samadli (Azerbaijan)
13 October 2016
20:30

Ekonomac (Serbia)	5–2	(Greece) Athina 90
Jovanović 6', 22'; Ramić 15'; Borisov 20', 38'	Report	Papadopoulos 9'; Triantis 13'

Jezero Hall, Kragujevac
Referee: David Schaerli (Switzerland), Nuno Bogalho (Portugal)

15 October 2016
18:00

Athina 90 (Greece)	0–6	(Croatia) Nacional Zagreb
	Report	Novak 3'; Čujec 9'; Postružin 13', 32'; Perić 13'; Amadeu 15'

Jezero Hall, Kragujevac
Referee: Elchin Samadli (Azerbaijan), David Schaerli (Switzerland)
15 October 2016
20:30

LSM Lida (Belarus)	0–1	(Serbia) Ekonomac
	Report	Borisov 29'

Jezero Hall, Kragujevac
Referee: Nuno Bogalho (Portugal), Tomasz Frąk (Poland)

=== Group 5 ===
Pos	Team	Pld	W	D	L	GF	GA	GD	Pts	Qualification
1	(Portugal) Sporting CP	3	3	0	0	16	2	+14	9	Elite round
2	(Italy) Real Rieti (H)	3	1	1	1	9	9	0	4	Elite round
3	(Belgium) Halle-Gooik	3	1	1	1	7	10	−3	4	
4	(Bosnia and Herzegovina) Centar Sarajevo	3	0	0	3	7	18	−11	0	

Source: UEFA
Rules for classification: Tiebreakers
(H) Hosts
12 October 2016
18:00

Sporting CP (Portugal)	7–1	(Bosnia and Herzegovina) Centar Sarajevo
Diogo 1'; Matos 2'; Leo 3'; Dieguinho 11'; Deo 16' (pen.); Alex Merlim 30' (pen.), 40'	Report	Jelić 7'

PalaPaternesi, Foligno
Referee: Gábor Kovács (Hungary), Costas Nicolaou (Cyprus)
12 October 2016
21:00

Real Rieti (Italy)	2–2	(Belgium) Halle-Gooik
Vieira 30', 40'	Report	Dujacquier 36'; Bissoni 40'

PalaPaternesi, Foligno
Referee: Josip Barton (Macedonia), Simon Rogers (Republic of Ireland)

13 October 2016
18:00

Halle-Gooik (Belgium)	1–5	(Portugal) Sporting CP
Leitão 30'	Report	Caio 5'; Diogo 22'; Alex Merlim 26'; Leo 34'; Fortino 38' (pen.)

PalaPaternesi, Foligno
Referee: Costas Nicolaou (Cyprus), Simon Rogers (Republic of Ireland)
13 October 2016
21:00

Real Rieti (Italy)	7–3	(Bosnia and Herzegovina) Centar Sarajevo
Vieira 3'; Saúl 4', 35'; Pedrito 25', 33'; Halimi 26'; Luizinho 37'	Report	Jelić 6'; Jusić 9'; Sipović 25'

PalaPaternesi, Foligno
Referee: Gábor Kovács (Hungary), Josip Barton (Macedonia)

15 October 2016
18:00

Centar Sarajevo (Bosnia and Herzegovina)	3–4	(Belgium) Halle-Gooik
Radmilović 18'; Jusić 33', 36'	Report	Rahou 13'; Bisson 25'; Mršo 30' (o.g.); Leo 37'

PalaPaternesi, Foligno
Referee: Josip Barton (Macedonia), Simon Rogers (Republic of Ireland)
15 October 2016
21:00

Sporting CP (Portugal)	4–0	(Italy) Real Rieti
Diogo 6'; Caio 7'; Alex Merlim 35'; Fortino 40'	Report

PalaPaternesi, Foligno
Referee: Gábor Kovács (Hungary), Costas Nicolaou (Cyprus)

=== Group 6 ===
Pos	Team	Pld	W	D	L	GF	GA	GD	Pts	Qualification
1	(Czech Republic) EP Chrudim (H)	3	3	0	0	14	1	+13	9	Elite round
2	(Romania) City'US Târgu Mureș	3	1	1	1	11	9	+2	4	Elite round
3	(Cyprus) APOEL Nicosia	3	1	1	1	9	15	−6	4	
4	(Slovakia) Pinerola Bratislava	3	0	0	3	9	18	−9	0	

Source: UEFA
Rules for classification: Tiebreakers
(H) Hosts
11 October 2016
16:30

City'US Târgu Mureș (Romania)	3–3	(Cyprus) APOEL Nicosia
Tipau 4'; Stoica 12' (pen.); Togan 35'	Report	Iacovou 2'; Omirou 20'; Carrasco 32'

Zimní Stadión, Chrudim
Referee: Swen Eichler (Germany), Nicola Manzione (Italy)
11 October 2016
19:00

EP Chrudim (Czech Republic)	4–1	(Slovakia) Pinerola Bratislava
Max 9'; Mareš 32'; Záruba 33'; Rešetár 38'	Report	Směřička 12'

Zimní Stadión, Chrudim
Referee: Oleg Ivanov (Ukraine), Ozan Soykan (Turkey)

12 October 2016
16:30

Pinerola Bratislava (Slovakia)	3–8	(Romania) City'US Târgu Mureș
Hájek 24'; Csala 27' (o.g.); Jurkemik 31'	Report	Mario Velasco 1'; Cardenas 9', 14'; Togan 11', 14'; Küsmödi 12'; Tipau 16'; Covaci 27'

Zimní Stadión, Chrudim
Referee: Nicola Manzione (Italy), Oleg Ivanov (Ukraine)
12 October 2016
19:00

EP Chrudim (Czech Republic)	7–0	(Cyprus) APOEL Nicosia
Rešetár 3', 29'; Koudelka 12'; Max 20'; Espindola 20'; Ricardinho 32'; Felipe 39'	Report

Zimní Stadión, Chrudim
Referee: Ozan Soykan (Turkey), Swen Eichler (Germany)

14 October 2016
16:30

APOEL Nicosia (Cyprus)	6–5	(Slovakia) Pinerola Bratislava
Cristian Magno 6'; Javnický 17' (o.g.); Christos Christodoulou 20'; Leo Feitoza 25', 36'; Nenê 38'	Report	Javnický 12'; Bagin 17'; Hájek 19', 33'; Směřička 30'

Zimní Stadión, Chrudim
Referee: Swen Eichler (Germany), Nicola Manzione (Italy)
14 October 2016
19:00

City'US Târgu Mureș (Romania)	0–3	(Czech Republic) EP Chrudim
	Report	R. Mareš 10'; Max 16'; Koudelka 34'

Zimní Stadión, Chrudim
Referee: Oleg Ivanov (Ukraine), Ozan Soykan (Turkey)

== Elite round ==
The draw for the elite round was held on 21 October 2016, 13:30 CEST (UTC+2), at the UEFA headquarters in Nyon, Switzerland. The 16 teams were drawn into four groups of four, containing one team which received byes to the elite round, and either two group winners and one group runner-up from the main round, or one group winner and two group runners-up from the main round. First, the four teams which were pre-selected as hosts (marked by (H) below) were drawn from their own designated pot and allocated to their respective group as per their seeding positions. Next, the remaining 12 teams were drawn from their respective pot which were allocated according to their seeding positions. Teams from the same main round group could not be drawn in the same group. Based on the decisions taken by the UEFA Emergency Panel, FC Feniks (Kosovo) and Ekonomac (Serbia) could not have been drawn into the same group.

Bye to elite round
Team
(Russia) Ugra Yugorsk
(Kazakhstan) Kairat Almaty (H)
(Spain) Inter FS
(Russia) Dinamo Moskva

Advanced from main round
Group	Winners	Runners-up
1	(Hungary) ETO Győr	(Slovenia) Brezje Maribor (H)
2	(Azerbaijan) Araz Naxçivan	(Kosovo) FC Feniks
3	(Latvia) Nikars Riga	(Germany) Hamburg Panthers
4	(Serbia) Ekonomac	(Croatia) Nacional Zagreb (H)
5	(Portugal) Sporting CP (H)	(Italy) Real Rieti
6	(Czech Republic) EP Chrudim	(Romania) City'US Târgu Mureș

The four group winners advanced to the final tournament.

All times were CET (UTC+1).

=== Group A ===
Pos	Team	Pld	W	D	L	GF	GA	GD	Pts	Qualification
1	(Kazakhstan) Kairat Almaty (H)	3	3	0	0	13	3	+10	9	Final tournament
2	(Italy) Real Rieti	3	2	0	1	15	6	+9	6	
3	(Latvia) Nikars Riga	3	1	0	2	5	14	−9	3	
4	(Kosovo) FC Feniks	3	0	0	3	6	16	−10	0	

Source: UEFA
Rules for classification: Tiebreakers
(H) Hosts
24 November 2016
13:00

Nikars Riga (Latvia)	4–3	(Kosovo) FC Feniks
J. Pastars 2'; Ewerton 18'; Seņs 36'; Astrahancevs 40'	Report	Caro 9', 38'; Brahimi 40'

Almaty Arena, Almaty
Attendance: 800
Referee: Trayan Enchev (Bulgaria), Petar Mantev (Macedonia)
24 November 2016
15:30

Kairat Almaty (Kazakhstan)	3–2	(Italy) Real Rieti
Divanei 3', 39' (pen.); Douglas Jr. 17'	Report	Jeffe 16'; Douglas Jr. 26' (o.g.)

Almaty Arena, Almaty
Attendance: 6500
Referee: Marc Birkett (England), Kamil Çetin (Turkey)

25 November 2016
13:00

Real Rieti (Italy)	7–0	(Latvia) Nikars Riga
Rizzi 4'; Corsini 15', 26'; Turmena 23'; Pedrito 26'; Saúl 39'; Luizinho 40'	Report

Almaty Arena, Almaty
Attendance: 400
Referee: Kamil Çetin (Turkey), Marc Birkett (England)
25 November 2016
15:30

Kairat Almaty (Kazakhstan)	6–0	(Kosovo) FC Feniks
Divanei 1', 14'; Dróth 18'; Nurgozhin 22'; Douglas Jr. 38'; Tayebi 40'	Report

Almaty Arena, Almaty
Attendance: 4000
Referee: Petar Mantev (Macedonia), Trayan Enchev (Bulgaria)

27 November 2016
10:00

FC Feniks (Kosovo)	3–6	(Italy) Real Rieti
Alibegu 1' (pen.); A. Brahimi 30'; Topilla 39'	Report	Rizzi 2'; Duio 5', 28', 34'; Turmena 16'; Jeffe 23'

Almaty Arena, Almaty
Attendance: 800
Referee: Trayan Enchev (Bulgaria), Petar Mantev (Macedonia)
27 November 2016
12:30

Nikars Riga (Latvia)	1–4	(Kazakhstan) Kairat Almaty
Neto 35' (o.g.)	Report	Igor 1'; Divanei 4', 7', 11'

Almaty Arena, Almaty
Attendance: 5000
Referee: Marc Birkett (England), Kamil Çetin (Turkey)

=== Group B ===
Pos	Team	Pld	W	D	L	GF	GA	GD	Pts	Qualification
1	(Russia) Ugra Yugorsk	3	3	0	0	13	1	+12	9	Final tournament
2	(Croatia) Nacional Zagreb (H)	3	2	0	1	14	7	+7	6	
3	(Azerbaijan) Araz Naxçivan	3	1	0	2	6	7	−1	3	
4	(Germany) Hamburg Panthers	3	0	0	3	2	20	−18	0	

Source: UEFA
Rules for classification: Tiebreakers
(H) Hosts
23 November 2016
18:00

Ugra Yugorsk (Russia)	4–0	(Germany) Hamburg Panthers
Davydov 2'; Eder Lima 4', 23'; Kotlyarov 32'	Report

Dom Sportova, Zagreb
Referee: Franco Cachia (Malta), Pascal Lemal (Belgium)
23 November 2016
20:30

Nacional Zagreb (Croatia)	2–1	(Azerbaijan) Araz Naxçivan
Novak 36', 40'	Report	Fineo 40'

Dom Sportova, Zagreb
Referee: Eduardo Fernandes Coelho (Portugal), Gabriel Gherman (Romania)

24 November 2016
18:00

Araz Naxçivan (Azerbaijan)	0–4	(Russia) Ugra Yugorsk
	Report	Eder Lima 10'; Marcênio 28'; Chishkala 32'; Caio 34'

Dom Sportova, Zagreb
Referee: Pascal Lemal (Belgium), Eduardo Fernandes Coelho (Portugal)
24 November 2016
20:30

Nacional Zagreb (Croatia)	11–1	(Germany) Hamburg Panthers
Jelovčić 8', 21', 23', 30'; R. Mordej 9'; Novak 10', 29', 30'; Rafael 20'; Perić 31'; Toth 39'	Report	Zankl 20' (pen.)

Dom Sportova, Zagreb
Referee: Gabriel Gherman (Romania), Franco Cachia (Malta)

26 November 2016
18:00

Hamburg Panthers (Germany)	1–5	(Azerbaijan) Araz Naxçivan
Ulusoy 27'	Report	Farzaliyev 4'; Fineo 6'; Everton Cardoso 9'; Bolinha 15'; Fabio Poletto 31'

Dom Sportova, Zagreb
Referee: Pascal Lemal (Belgium), Franco Cachia (Malta)
26 November 2016
20:30

Ugra Yugorsk (Russia)	5–1	(Croatia) Nacional Zagreb
Kotlyarov 24'; Shayakhmetov 29'; Caio 36'; Davydov 38'; Afanasyev 39'	Report	Jelovčić 25'

Dom Sportova, Zagreb
Referee: Eduardo Fernandes Coelho (Portugal), Gabriel Gherman (Romania)

=== Group C ===
Pos	Team	Pld	W	D	L	GF	GA	GD	Pts	Qualification
1	(Spain) Inter FS	3	3	0	0	13	2	+11	9	Final tournament
2	(Czech Republic) EP Chrudim	3	1	0	2	4	4	0	3	
3	(Slovenia) Brezje Maribor (H)	3	1	0	2	8	9	−1	3	
4	(Serbia) Ekonomac	3	1	0	2	4	14	−10	3	

Source: UEFA
Rules for classification: Tiebreakers
(H) Hosts
23 November 2016
16:30

Inter FS (Spain)	2–0	(Czech Republic) EP Chrudim
Ricardinho 10'; Daniel 24'	Report

Tabor Hall, Maribor
Referee: Miguel Castilho (Portugal), Alessandro Malfer (Italy)
23 November 2016
19:00

Brezje Maribor (Slovenia)	6–2	(Serbia) Ekonomac
Totošković 13'; Kraljič 29', 29'; Fetić 32' (pen.), 40'; Čeh 40'	Report	Ramić 19'; Borisov 29'

Tabor Hall, Maribor
Referee: Gerd Bylois (Belgium), Ivan Shabanov (Russia)

24 November 2016
16:30

Ekonomac (Serbia)	1–8	(Spain) Inter FS
Ramić 4'	Report	Rafael 5'; Pola 7', 24'; Bruno Taffy 18'; Pazos 21'; Borja 25', 37'; Darlan 32'

Tabor Hall, Maribor
Referee: Alessandro Malfer (Italy), Gerd Bylois (Belgium)
24 November 2016
19:00

Brezje Maribor (Slovenia)	1–4	(Czech Republic) EP Chrudim
Škorić 20'	Report	Záruba 5', 39'; Max 21'; Rešetár 22'

Tabor Hall, Maribor
Referee: Ivan Shabanov (Russia), Miguel Castilho (Portugal)

26 November 2016
18:30

EP Chrudim (Czech Republic)	0–1	(Serbia) Ekonomac
	Report	Borisov 31'

Tabor Hall, Maribor
Referee: Ivan Shabanov (Russia), Miguel Castilho (Portugal)
26 November 2016
21:15

Inter FS (Spain)	3–1	(Slovenia) Brezje Maribor
Pazos 13'; Ricardinho 40'; Mario Rivillos 40'	Report	Fetić 27'

Tabor Hall, Maribor
Referee: Alessandro Malfer (Italy), Gerd Bylois (Belgium)

=== Group D ===
Pos	Team	Pld	W	D	L	GF	GA	GD	Pts	Qualification
1	(Portugal) Sporting CP (H)	3	2	1	0	23	5	+18	7	Final tournament
2	(Russia) Dinamo Moskva	3	2	1	0	19	5	+14	7	
3	(Hungary) ETO Győr	3	1	0	2	7	9	−2	3	
4	(Romania) City'US Târgu Mureș	3	0	0	3	2	32	−30	0	

Source: UEFA
Rules for classification: Tiebreakers
(H) Hosts
24 November 2016
19:00

Dinamo Moskva (Russia)	11–1	(Romania) City'US Târgu Mureș
Fukin 5', 30'; Ari 11'; Suchilin 14', 24'; Nando 22'; Cirilo 28'; Fernandinho 29', 31', 33' (pen.); Badretdinov 34'	Report	Tipau 33'

Pavilhão Multiusos Odivelas, Odivelas
Referee: Saša Tomić (Croatia), Juan Gallardo (Spain)
24 November 2016
21:30

Sporting CP (Portugal)	4–1	(Hungary) ETO Győr
Cavinato 1'; Diogo 21'; Dieguinho 24'; João Matos 40'	Report	Álex 37'

Pavilhão Multiusos Odivelas, Odivelas
Referee: Cédric Pelissier (France), Borut Šivic (Slovenia)

25 November 2016
19:00

ETO Győr (Hungary)	1–5	(Russia) Dinamo Moskva
Jaison 27'	Report	Fukin 15', 25'; Suchilin 25'; Robinho 35'; Badretdinov 39'

Pavilhão Multiusos Odivelas, Odivelas
Referee: Borut Šivic (Slovenia), Saša Tomić (Croatia)
25 November 2016
21:30

Sporting CP (Portugal)	16–1	(Romania) City'US Târgu Mureș
Marcão 2'; Diogo 7', 28', 36'; Dieguinho 12', 28'; Edgar Varela 21', 22', 28'; Deo 25'; Fortino 25', 33', 35'; Cavinato 30', 31'; Pedro Cary 40'	Report	Stoica 33'

Pavilhão Multiusos Odivelas, Odivelas
Referee: Juan Gallardo (Spain), Cédric Pelissier (France)

27 November 2016
15:30

City'US Târgu Mureș (Romania)	0–5	(Hungary) ETO Győr
	Report	Jaison 4'; Davide Moura 24'; Drahovský 24'; Boroş 37' (o.g.); Leandrinho 39'

Pavilhão Multiusos Odivelas, Odivelas
Referee: Cédric Pelissier (France), Borut Šivic (Slovenia)
27 November 2016
18:00

Dinamo Moskva (Russia)	3–3	(Portugal) Sporting CP
Cirilo 9'; Fukin 10'; Fernandinho 35'	Report	João Matos 6'; Diogo 23'; Cavinato 27'

Pavilhão Multiusos Odivelas, Odivelas
Referee: Saša Tomić (Croatia), Juan Gallardo (Spain)

== Final tournament ==
The hosts of the final tournament was selected by UEFA from the four qualified teams, with UEFA announcing on 9 December 2016 that it would be hosted by Kairat Almaty at the Almaty Arena, in Almaty, Kazakhstan.

The draw for the final tournament was held on 4 March 2017, 15:45 ALMT (UTC+6), at the Almaty Central Stadium in Almaty, during half-time of the 2017 Kazakhstan Super Cup. The four teams were drawn into two semi-finals without any restrictions.

In the final tournament, extra time and penalty shoot-out would be used to decide the winner if necessary; however, no extra time would be used in the third place match.

=== Bracket ===
Semi-finals
28 April
(Russia) Ugra Yugorsk	1
(Portugal) Sporting CP	2
28 April
(Spain) Inter FS	3
(Kazakhstan) Kairat Almaty	2

Final
30 April
(Portugal) Sporting CP	0
(Spain) Inter FS	7
Third place match
30 April
(Russia) Ugra Yugorsk	5 (2)
(Kazakhstan) Kairat Almaty (p)	5 (3)

All times are CEST (UTC+2); local times, ALMT (UTC+6), are in parentheses.

=== Semi-finals ===
28 April 2017
14:00
(18:00 UTC+6)

Ugra Yugorsk (Russia)	1–2	(Portugal) Sporting CP
Shayakhmetov 39'	Report	Merlim 25'; Dieguinho 34'

Almaty Arena, Almaty
Attendance: 3718
Referee: Saša Tomić (Croatia), Gábor Kovács (Hungary)

28 April 2017
16:30
(20:30 UTC+6)

Inter FS (Spain)	3–2	(Kazakhstan) Kairat Almaty
Ricardinho 13', 23' (pen.); Ortiz 39'	Report	Cabreúva 5'; Igor 16'

Almaty Arena, Almaty
Attendance: 10 238
Referee: Bogdan Sorescu (Romania), Alessandro Malfer (Italy)

=== Third place match ===
30 April 2017
13:00
(17:00 UTC+6)

Ugra Yugorsk (Russia)	5–5	(Kazakhstan) Kairat Almaty
Shayakhmetov 2'; Caio 14'; Lyskov 23'; Divanei 37' (o.g.); Marcênio 40'	Report	Dróth 9'; Davydov 16' (o.g.); Tayebi 25'; Cabreúva 33'; Divanei 39'
Penalties
	2–3

Almaty Arena, Almaty
Attendance: 7983
Referee: Alessandro Malfer (Italy), Gábor Kovács (Hungary)

=== Final ===
30 April 2017
15:30
(19:30 UTC+6)

Sporting CP (Portugal)	0–7	(Spain) Inter FS
	Report	Gadeia 7'; Lolo 16'; Rafael 23'; Mario Rivillos 24', 32'; Ricardinho 34', 37'

Almaty Arena, Almaty
Attendance: 6353
Referee: Saša Tomić (Croatia), Bogdan Sorescu (Romania)

== Top goalscorers ==
— Team eliminated / inactive for this stage.

Rank	Player	Team	PR	MR	ER	FT	Total
1	(Azerbaijan) Bolinha	(Azerbaijan) Araz Naxçivan	—	8	1	—	9
1	(Slovenia) Alen Fetić	(Slovenia) Brezje Maribor	4	2	3	—	9
1	(Brazil) Nenê	(Cyprus) APOEL Nicosia	8	1	—	—	9
1	(Finland) Rami Tirkkonen	(Finland) Sievi Futsal	9	—	—	—	9
1	(Slovenia) Denis Totošković	(Slovenia) Brezje Maribor	5	3	1	—	9
6	(Brazil) Diogo	(Portugal) Sporting CP	—	3	5	0	8
6	(Brazil) Divanei	(Kazakhstan) Kairat Almaty	—	—	7	1	8
6	(Georgia (country)) Archil Sebiskveradze	(Georgia (country)) Tbilisi State University	4	4	—	—	8

Source: UEFA.com
