= List of futsal competitions =

Colours used to indicate competition types
(Blue) Senior men competitions
(Cyan) Youth men competitions
(Red) Senior women competitions
(Fuchsia) Youth women competitions
(Darker colours) Competitions between (sub-)national teams
(Medium colours) Leagues or championships between clubs
(Lighter colours) Cups or tournaments between clubs

This is a list of the futsal competitions past and present for international teams and for club futsal, in individual countries and internationally. The competitions are grouped by organizing authority: FIFA (international association), the six confederations (continental associations), the federations (national associations) and the AMF (international association).

== FIFA (Intercontinental competitions) ==
This section lists the worldwide and intercontinental competitions ruled by the FIFA, by two or more confederations or by two or more federations member of different confederations.

National teams

- FIFA Futsal World Cup
- FIFA Futsal Women's World Cup

Clubs

- Intercontinental Futsal Cup

== AFC (Asian competitions) ==
This section lists the competitions ruled by the Asian Football Confederation, or by federations member the Asian Football Confederation.

National teams

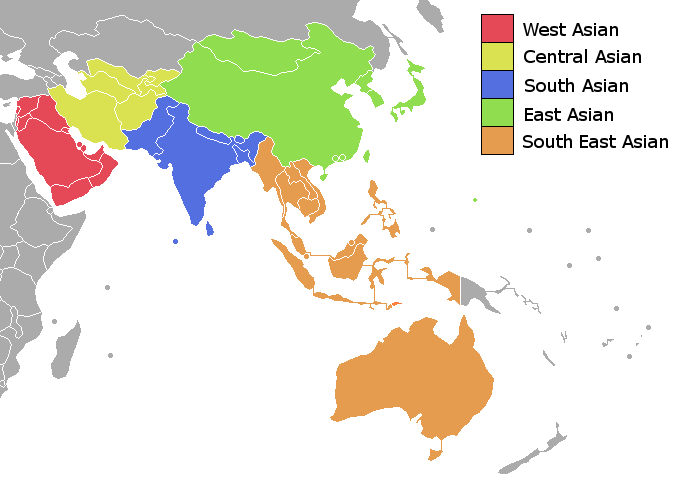
Federations member the Asian Football Confederation

- AFC Futsal Asian Cup
- AFC Women's Futsal Asian Cup

Clubs

- AFC Futsal Club Championship

=== Australia ===
Tier	Victoria	New South Wales	Queensland	Western Australia	South Australia	Australia Capital Territory	Northern Territory	Tasmania
1	Series Futsal Victoria FFV F-League	New South Wales Premier Futsal League	Queensland F.League	Supa Liga A	Pro Futsal South Australia State Futsal League	Capital Futsal League	Not Held	Not Held
2	Series Futsal State League Championship	New South Wales Premier Futsal League 2	Queensland Futsal Premier League	Supa Liga B	Not Held	Not Held	Not Held	Not Held
3	Series Futsal State League One	Sydney Premier League Australian Futbol Sala League (AFSL)	Not Held	Supa Liga C Pro Futsal Western Australia State Futsal League	Not Held	Not Held	Not Held	Not Held
4	Series Futsal State League Two	Not Held	Not Held	Pro Futsal Western Australia State Futsal League Draft	Not Held	Not Held	Not Held	Not Held
5	Series Futsal State League Three	Not Held	Not Held	Not Held	Not Held	Not Held	Not Held	Not Held
6	Series Futsal State League Four Pro Futsal Mount Evelyn Premier League	Not Held	Not Held	Not Held	Not Held	Not Held	Not Held	Not Held
Developmental Leagues	Series Futsal Men's Youth League Pro Futsal Mount Evelyn Youth League	Not Held	Queensland Youth Futsal League	20 Men's Supa Liga Pro Futsal Western Australia Youth State Futsal League	Not Held	Not Held	Not Held	Not Held

(Australia)	Competitions	League/Cup	See also: Futsal in Australia
	F-League (2011-2017)	1st-tier league	Professional and Semi-Professional Futsal Clubs
Australian Capital Territory
	A.C.T Futsal Premier League	1st-tier league	Professional and Semi-Professional Futsal Clubs
	Series Futsal A.C.T	1st-tier league	Professional and Semi-Professional Futsal Clubs
	Senior Social Futsal League Division 1	2nd-tier league	Top Amateur Futsal Clubs
	Senior Social Futsal League Division 2	3rd-tier league	Top Amateur Futsal Clubs
	Senior Social Futsal League Division 3	4th-tier league	Top Amateur Futsal Clubs
	Senior Social Futsal League Division 4	5th-tier league	Top Amateur Futsal Clubs
	Senior Social Futsal League Division 5	6th-tier league	Top Amateur Futsal Clubs
New South Wales
	NSW Futsal Premier League	1st-tier league	Professional and Semi-Professional Futsal Clubs
	NSW Futsal Premier League 2	2nd-tier league	Semi-Professional Futsal Clubs
	Series Futsal NSW	1st-tier league	Professional and Semi-Professional Futsal Clubs
Queensland
	SEQ Futsal Premier League	1st-tier league	Semi-Professional Futsal Clubs
	Queensland Futsal League	1st-tier league	Semi-Professional Futsal Clubs
	Series Futsal Queensland	1st-tier league	Semi-Professional Futsal Clubs
Victoria
	Series Futsal Victoria	1st-tier league	Professional and Semi-Professional Futsal Clubs
	Victoria State League Championship	2nd tier league	Semi-Professional Futsal Clubs
	Victoria State League One	3rd tier league	Semi-Professional Futsal Clubs
	Victoria State League Two	4th tier league	Semi-Professional Futsal Clubs and Top Amateur Futsal Clubs
	Victoria State League Three	5th tier league	Semi-Professional Futsal Clubs and Top Amateur Futsal Clubs
	Futsal Oz Premier Leagues	6th tier league	Top Amateur Futsal Clubs
	Futsal Oz Social Leagues	7th tier league	Top Amateur Futsal Clubs and Amateur Futsal Clubs
	AFG Premier League	Non-tier league	Semi-Professional Futsal Clubs and Top Amateur Futsal Clubs
	PRO FUTSAL Mt Evelyn Premier League	Eastern Melbourne 1st tier league	Semi-Professional Futsal Clubs and Top Amateur Futsal Clubs
	PRO FUTSAL Mt Evelyn Division 2 League	Eastern Melbourne 2nd tier league	Top Amateur Clubs and Social Teams
	PRO FUTSAL Mt Evelyn Division 3 League	Eastern Melbourne 3rd tier league	Top Amateur Clubs and Social Teams

=== India ===
- Top level league- Premier Futsal

=== Indonesia ===
- Top level league- Indonesia Pro Futsal League

=== Iran ===
- Top level league- Iranian Futsal Super League

=== Japan ===
- F.League : 1st/2nd-tier league
- JFA Japan Futsal Championship : National cup
- F.League Ocean Cup : League cup

=== Myanmar ===
- Tier 1 - MFF Futsal League
- Tier 2 - MFF Futsal League II
- National Cup - MFF Futsal Champion Cup
- Amateur Cup - MFF Futsal Amateur Cup

=== Singapore ===
Amateur Futsal League

- Kyna Futsal League

== CAF (African competitions) ==
This section lists the competitions ruled by the Confederation of African Football, or by federations member the Confederation of African Football.

National teams

- African Futsal Championship

Clubs

== CONCACAF (North American, Central American and Caribbean competitions) ==
This section lists the competitions ruled by the CONCACAF (Confederation of North, Central American and Caribbean Association Football), or by federations member the CONCACAF.

National teams

- CONCACAF Futsal Championship

Clubs

=== U.S.A. ===
- National League of Professional Futsal (NLPF) in partnership with U.S. Futsal
- TBD promotion - Professional Futsal League

== CONMEBOL (South American competitions) ==
This section lists the competitions ruled by the CONMEBOL (Confederación Sudamericana de Fútbol), or by federations member the CONMEBOL.

National teams

- Copa América – FIFA Futsal (CONMEBOL)

Clubs

- South American Club Futsal Championship

=== Argentina ===
- Top level league- Argentine Division de Honor de Futsal

=== Brazil ===
- Top level league- Liga Nacional de Futsal

=== Peru ===
- Top level league - División de Honor de Fútbol Sala (Perú)

== OFC (Oceanian competitions) ==
This section lists the competitions ruled by the Oceania Football Confederation, or by federations member the Oceania Football Confederation.

American Samoa | Cook Islands | Fiji | New Caledonia | New Zealand | Papua New Guinea | Samoa | Solomon Islands | Tahiti | Tonga | Vanuatu

National teams

- Oceanian Futsal Championship

Clubs

=== Marshall Islands ===
- Top level league- Marshall Islands Futsal League

=== Solomon Islands ===
- Top level league- Telekom S-League

== UEFA (European competitions) ==
This section lists the competitions ruled by the UEFA (Union of European Football Associations), or by federations member the UEFA.

National teams

- UEFA Futsal Championship
- UEFA Futsal Under-21 Championship
- UEFA Under-19 Futsal Championship

Clubs

- UEFA Futsal Champions League

http://old.futsalplanet.com/agenda/agenda-01.asp?id=20744

European Universities Futsal Championships

=== Albania ===
- Albanian Futsal Championship
- Albanian Futsal Cup

=== Andorra ===
- 1ª Divisió
- 2ª Divisió
- Memorial Joan Canut I Bové (National Cup)
- Andorran Futsal Supercup

=== Armenia ===
- Armenian Championship
- Armenian Futsal Cup

=== Austria ===
- Murexin Futsal Bundesliga
- Austrian 2. Futsal Liga
- Austrian Futsal Cup
- Austrian Futsal Supercup
- Austrian Futsal League Cup

=== Azerbaijan ===
- Azerbaijan Premier League
- Azerbaijan Cup

=== Belarus ===
- Belarusian Futsal Premier League
- Belarusian Futsal Cup

=== Belgium ===
- Belgian Futsal Division 1
- Belgian Futsal Cup
- Belgian Futsal Supercup

=== Bosnia and Herzegovina ===
- Futsal Championship of Bosnia and Herzegovina
  - BIH Federation Futsal Premier League
  - Republic of Srpska Futsal Premier League
- Futsal Cup of Bosnia and Herzegovina

=== Bulgaria ===
- Bulgarian Premiere Futsal League
- Bulgarian Futsal Cup

=== Croatia ===
- Croatian 1.HMNL
- Croatian Futsal Cup

=== Cyprus ===
- Cypriot Futsal First Division
- Cypriot Futsal Second Division
- Cypriot Futsal Cup

=== Denmark ===
- Top level league- Danish Futsal Championship

=== England ===
- Tier 1 - The FA National Futsal Series 1
- Tier 2 - The FA National Futsal Series 2 (North & South)
- Tier 3 - The National Futsal League
- FA Futsal Cup
- FA Women's Futsal Cup
- The FA National Futsal Series (Women)

=== France ===
- Championnat de France de Futsal
- Coupe Nationale Futsal

=== Germany ===
- DFB Futsal Cup (national cup)

=== Republic of Ireland ===
- Ireland Futsal Union Cup

=== Italy ===
- Serie A1 (Futsal)
- Serie A2 (Futsal)
- Serie B (Futsal)
- Serie C1 (Futsal)
- Serie C2 (Futsal)
- Serie D (Futsal)
- Coppa Italia (Futsal)
- Supercoppa Italia (Futsal)

=== Kosovo ===
- Superliga - Futsall（1st-tier league）
- Liga e parë - Futsall（2nd-tier league）

=== Lithuania ===
- A Lyga
- Lithuanian Futsal Cup（Cup）

=== Netherlands ===
- Topdivisie

=== Russia ===
- Russian Futsal Super League
- Russian Futsal Cup

=== Serbia ===
- Prva Futsal Liga

=== Spain ===
- División de Honor de Futsal
- División de Plata de Futsal
- Primera Nacional A de Futsal
- Primera Nacional B de Futsal
- Copa de España de Futsal
- Supercopa de España de Futsal

=== Sweden ===
- Swedish Futsal League
- Swedish Futsal Championship

== AMF (Intercontinental competitions) ==
This section lists the competitions ruled by the AMF. this list is incomplete

National teams

- AMF Futsal World Cup
- AMF Women's World Futsal Championships

== UEFS (European competitions) ==
This section lists the competitions ruled by the UEFS (Union European of Futsal), or by federations member the UEFS.

National teams

- UEFS Futsal Women's Championship
