= Mladen Kocić =

Serbian futsal player

Personal information
- Full name: Mladen Kocić
- Date of birth: 22 October 1988 (age 38)
- Place of birth: Niš, SFR Yugoslavia
- Height: 1.75 m (5 ft 9 in)
- Position: Winger

Team information
- Current team: KMF Loznica Grad
- Number: 10

Youth career
- ?: Radnički
- ?: OFK Niš

Senior career*
Years	Team	Apps	(Gls)
2006–2007	Kopernikus		
2007–2014	Ekonomac		
2014–2016	Nacional	17	(27)
2016–	Tyumen	0	(0)

International career
?	Serbia	31	(19)
- * Club domestic league appearances and goals as of 10 August 2016.

Mladen "Cipi" Kocić (Serbian Cyrillic: Младен "Ципи" Коцић, born 22 October 1988), is a Serbian futsal player who plays for Russian club Tyumen and the Serbia national futsal team. He also represented Serbia national futsal team at UEFA Futsal Euro 2016 in Serbia.

== Career ==
Kocić before his futsal career playing for Radnički and OFK Niš. He started to play futsal with 18 years in the Kopernikus, that after only six months moved to Ekonomac. With Ekonomac won six championship titles of Serbia, three Serbian Cup and one Balkan Cup. For six seasons he amassed 30 appearances and 14 goals in UEFA competitions. 2014 moved to Nacional. After 2 season with Nacional, in summer 2016 Kocić joined to MFK Tyumen.

== Honours ==
Ekonomac

- Serbian Prva Futsal Liga (7): 2007–08, 2008–09, 2009–10, 2010–11, 2011–12, 2012–13, 2013–14
- Serbian Futsal Cup (3): 2009–10, 2012–13, 2013–14
- Balkan Futsal Cup (1): 2008

Nacional

- Croatian Prva HMNL (2): 2014–15, 2015–16
