= Nikola Rnić =

Serbian footballer

Personal information
- Full name: Nikola Rnić
- Date of birth: 11 January 1984 (age 42)
- Place of birth: Zemun, SFR Yugoslavia
- Height: 1.86 m (6 ft 1 in)
- Position: Midfielder

Team information
- Current team: Ekonomac (Futsal)
- Number: 8

Senior career*
Years	Team	Apps	(Gls)
2002–2004	BSK Batajnica		
2004–2005	Radnički Nova Pazova	15	(1)
2005	→ Dunav Stari Banovci (loan)		
2005	Hajduk Lion	15	(1)
2006–2007	BASK	14	(1)
2007	Zemun	2	(0)
2007–2009	Ekonomac (Futsal)		
2009–2010	Čukarički	21	(0)
2011	Srem Jakovo	9	(2)
2011	Banat Zrenjanin	10	(0)
2012–2013	Zemun	35	(10)
2013–2014	Radnik Surdulica	23	(2)
2014–2015	Inđija	28	(5)
2015–	Ekonomac (Futsal)		
- * Club domestic league appearances and goals as of 22 October 2016

Nikola Rnić (Serbian Cyrillic: Никола Рнић; born 11 January 1984) is a Serbian football midfielder who plays for Ekonomac in Prva Futsal Liga.

== Career ==
From 2002 to 2007 he played for BSK Batajnica, Radnički Nova Pazova, Dunav Stari Banovci, Hajduk Lion, BASK and Zemun. Then he played with Ekonomac Kragujevac in Prva Futsal Liga for season and half. After that, he returned in football and played for Čukarički on 21 Jelen SuperLiga, and later for Srem Jakovo, Banat Zrenjanin and Zemun. In 2013, he moved in Radnik Surdulica.

In 2015, he returned in Futsal and play for Ekonomac.
