= Serbian Futsal Cup =

- Founded: 2005
- Region: Serbia
- Current champions: Ekonomac (5th title)
- Most championships: Ekonomac (5 titles)

The Serbian Futsal Cup is an annual cup competition for Serbian futsal teams. It is organized by the Football Association of Serbia and was founded in the 2005–06 season.

== Finals ==
Season	Location	Winner	Runner-up	Score
2005–06	Medison Hall, Zrenjanin	SAS Zrenjanin	Marbo	3–3 p. 9–8
2010–11	SC Šumice, Belgrade	Marbo Intermezzo	Vranje	4–0
2011–12	SC Šumice, Belgrade	Marbo Intermezzo	Ekonomac	3–1
2012–13	Jezero Hall, Kragujevac	Ekonomac	Marbo Intermezzo	5–2
2013–14	Breza Hall, Gornji Milanovac	Ekonomac	Kopernikus	5–4
2014–15	Ub Hall, Ub	Bečej	Ekonomac	3–1
2015–16	Sports Hall, Smederevo	Euro Motus	Ekonomac	3–0
2016–17	Sports Hall, Požarevac	Ekonomac	Novi Pazar	3–0
2017–18	Sports Hall, Obrenovac	Ekonomac	Novi Pazar	6–3
2018–19	Sports Hall, Šabac	Ekonomac	Nova Pazova	7–2

=== Winners by titles ===
Club	Winners	Runners-up	Winning years
Ekonomac (Kragujevac)	5	3	2013, 2014, 2017, 2018, 2019
Marbo Intermezzo (Belgrade)	2	2	2011, 2012
SAS (Zrenjanin)	1	0	2006
Bečej	1	0	2015
Euro Motus (Belgrade)	1	0	2016
Novi Pazar (Novi Pazar)	0	2	2017, 2018
Nova Pazova (Nova Pazova)	0	1	2019
Vranje	0	1	2011
Kopernikus (Niš)	0	1	2014

== Related competitions ==
- Prva Futsal Liga
