= Aleksandar Živanović =

Aleksandar Živanović may refer to:

- Aleksandar Živanović (futsal player)
- Aleksandar Živanović (footballer, born 1987)
