= Premier Futsal League of Bosnia and Herzegovina =

Premijer futsal liga BiH
- Founded: 1994
- Country: Bosnia and Herzegovina
- Confederation: UEFA
- Number of clubs: 10
- Level on pyramid: 1
- Relegation to: First League of FBiH; First League of RS
- Domestic cup: Kup BiH
- International cup: UEFA Futsal Cup
- Most championships: Mostar Stari Grad (5 titles)
- Website: Website
- Current: Current Season at UEFA.com

The Premier Futsal League of Bosnia and Herzegovina (Bosnian: Premijer futsal liga Bosne i Hercegovine; Serbian: Премијер футсал лига Босне и Херцеговине) is the top-level futsal league in Bosnia and Herzegovina. The competition is organized and run by the Football Federation of Bosnia and Herzegovina although clubs have their own organization.

== Formation and history ==
The Premier League was founded in 2013. Since 1994 there have been two leagues based on entity principles with best teams from both taking part in playoff to crown national champion. Later, after UEFA decided to help Bosnia and Herzegovina FA to establish nationwide league played in whole country, the league itself was started in 2013, along with Women's football league (also assisted by UEFA).

=== Competition format ===
12 teams take part in the competition. The league is played in two phases. In the first phase teams play each other once in 11 rounds. Top six teams qualify to Championship stage while bottom six teams qualify to Relegation stage. In both second phase stages teams play each other twice on home-away basis so there are 21 rounds (11+10) total. Top team of Championship stage is crowned champion while bottom two teams of Relegation stage are relegated.

In first two season (2013-14 and 2014-15), competition was played in home-away round-robin format. Top team after 22 rounds was crowned champion.

If relegated teams comes from Federation of Bosnia and Herzegovina entity, they will play in First league of Federation of Bosnia and Herzegovina next season; otherwise, if team comes from Republic of Srpska entity, it will take part in First league of Republic of Srpska next season. Relegated teams could be both from same entity. Champions of entity leagues (First League of Federation of Bosnia and Herzegovina; First League of Republika Srpska) are promoted to the Premier league.

Winner of the competition qualifies to UEFA Futsal Cup.

=== Champions ===
Listed below are the champions of Premier League.

Rank	Club	Titles	Seasons
1	Mostar Stari Grad	5	2016-17, 2017-18, 2018-19, 2020-21, 2021-22
2	Centar Sarajevo	3	2013-14, 2014-15, 2015-16
3	Salines Tuzla	1	2019-20
4	KMF Radnik Bijeljina	1	2022-23
5	MNK Hercegovina	1	2023-24
6	MNK Bubamara Cazin	1	2024-25

==== Before Premier League ====
Rank	Club	Titles	Seasons
1	Kaskada Gračanica	4	1998-99, 2000-01, 2002-03, 2006-07
2	Karaka Mostar	3	2001-02, 2004-05, 2005-06
2	Leotar Trebinje	3	2008-09, 2010-11, 2011-12
4	Partizan Sarajevo	2	1994-95, 2005-06
4	Orlić Sarajevo	2	2007-08, 2009-10
6	Kreka Tuzlanska Tuzla	1	1995-96
6	Bihać	1	1996-97
6	Kompred Tuzla	1	1997-98
6	Banovići	1	1999-00
6	Tango Istočno Sarajevo	1	2012-13

== Teams ==
Locations of the 2017–18 Premier Futsal League of Bosnia and Herzegovina teams

Eight teams are representing Federation of Bosnia and Herzegovina while four are representing Republic of Srpska.

Club	City	Arena	Season
MNK Brotnjo Čitluk	Čitluk	Gradska dvorana	5th
Centar Sarajevo	Sarajevo	Ramiz Salčin	5th
Brčko ‡	Brčko		1st
Željezničar Sarajevo ‡	Sarajevo		1st
Kaskada Gračanica	Gračanica		5th
Leotar Trebinje	Trebinje	Miloš Mrdić	5th
Mostar Stari Grad †	Mostar		5th
Nevesinje	Nevesinje	Nevesinjka	3rd
Seljak Livno	Livno	Dalibor Perković Dali	5th
Sofić Konjic	Konjic	Gradska dvorana	3rd
Tango Istočno Sarajevo	Istočno Sarajevo	O.Š. Aleksa Šantić	5th
Zrinjski Mostar	Mostar	Dvorana Bijeli brijeg	5th

† title holder
‡ promoted

=== All-time table ===
Below is the Premier league all-time table, as of 2016-17 season completion. Total of 16 teams played in the competition during four seasons. Two new teams are set for their debut in 2017-18. One team that pulled out of competition in first season, Karaka Mostar, is not counted as all of their matches were annulled.

Rank	Team	S	GP	W	D	L	G+	G−	Pts
1	Centar Sarajevo	4	84	62	14	8	426	232	200
2	Brotnjo Čitluk	4	84	48	11	25	381	302	155
3	Zrinjski Mostar	4	84	47	13	24	354	254	154
4	Mostar Stari Grad	4	84	47	8	29	340	280	149
5	Tango Istočno Sarajevo	4	84	46	4	34	294	265	142
6	Čelinac	4	84	31	10	43	263	332	103
7	Leotar Trebinje	4	84	33	3	48	267	310	102
8	Seljak Livno	4	84	30	8	46	299	332	98
9	Kaskada Gračanica	4	84	29	8	47	320	365	95
10	Bosna Tuzla	2	43	19	3	21	176	168	60
11	Sofić Konjic	2	42	18	2	22	184	183	56
12	Nevesinje	2	43	12	3	28	134	179	39
13	Sokrates Banja Luka	2	42	10	6	26	138	221	36
14	Salines Tuzla	1	21	10	2	9	76	78	32
15	Galaktikosi Visoko	1	20	4	1	15	68	99	13
16	Jošavka Čelinac	1	21	0	0	21	38	162	0
17	Željezničar Sarajevo	promoted, will play in 2017-18 season							
17	Brčko	promoted, will play in 2017-18 season							

S - number of seasons; GP - games played; W, D, L - games won, drawn, lost, G+, G− - goals for, against; Pts - points

Members of the league for 2017-18 season

=== Season by season positions ===
Team	2013-14	2014-15	2015-16	2016-17	2017-18
Bosna Tuzla	-	6	11	-	-
Brotnjo Čitluk	3	3	3	8	
Centar Sarajevo	1	1	1	2	
Čelinac	6	8	9	11	-
Galaktikosi Visoko	11	-	-	-	-
Jošavka Čelinac	-	-	12	-	-
Kaskada Gračanica	5	8	9	12	-
Leotar Trebinje	9	4	5	6	
Mostar Stari Grad	8	7	2	1	
Nevesinje	-	12	-	10	
Salines Tuzla	-	-	-	7	
Seljak Livno	7	10	6	9	
Sokrates Banja Luka	10	11	-	-	-
Tango Istočno Sarajevo	2	5	7	4	
Zrinjski Mostar	4	2	4	3	
Brčko	-	-	-	-	
Željezničar Sarajevo	-	-	-	-	

Champion
Relegated

== International competitions ==
Winner of the competition qualifies to UEFA Futsal Cup. The best result in the competition by a team from Bosnia and Herzegovina was achieved in 2013-14 edition when Tango reached Elite round (best 16 teams of the competition) and competed in group C.

== Also see ==
- List of futsal competitions
- UEFA Futsal Championship
- UEFA Under-21 Futsal Tournament
- UEFA Under-19 Futsal Championship
- UEFA Women's Futsal Championship
