= KMF SAS =

Serbian futsal club

KMF Kopernikus SAS
- Full name: Klub malog fudbala Kopernikus SAS
- Founded: 1970; 56 years ago
- Ground: Medison Hall, Zrenjanin, Serbia
- Capacity: 2,500
- Chairman: (Serbia) Dragan Erić
- Manager: (Serbia) Dejan Majes
- League: Prva Futsal Liga
- 2024–25: 7th
Home colours	Away colours

Klub malog fudbala Kopernikus SAS (Serbian Cyrillic: Клуб малог фудбала Коперникус САС), is a Serbian futsal club based in Zrenjanin, Serbia.

From 2003 until 2008, the club made its greatest achievements when it won four consecutive national championships. At the time, it was named KMF Marbo and was sponsored by food company Marbo Product. Also, from 2011 to 2013 it was three times runner-up in the competition.

== History ==
=== Names of the club through history ===
Year	Club
1970–1998	KMF Mungosi
1998–2003	KMF Tempo Company
2003–2008	KMF Marbo
2008–2013	KMF Marbo Intermezzo — fusion KMF Marbo and KMF Intermezzo
2013–2016	KMF SAS Marbo Maksbet
2016–	KMF Kopernikus SAS — fusion KMF SAS and KMF Kopernikus

=== Crest through history ===
KMF Marbo Intermezzo
(2008–2013)

== Honours ==
=== National ===
- 3 Serbia & Montenegro League: 2004, 2005, 2006
- 1 Serbian League: 2007
- Serbian Cup: 2011, 2012

== Notable former players ==
- (Serbia) Zoran Rakićević
- (Serbia) Predrag Brzaković
- (Serbia) Vladimir Ranisavljević
- (Serbia) Darko Tofoski
- (Serbia) Igor Šošo
- (Serbia) Željko Borojević
- (Serbia) Goran Ivančić
- (Serbia) Vladan Cvetanović
- (Serbia) Marko Perić
- (Serbia) Zoran Dimić
- (Serbia) Predrag Rajić
- (Serbia) Bojan Pavićević
- (Serbia) Željko Dragoljević
- (Serbia) Borko Surudžić
- (Serbia) Milan Bogdanović
- (Brazil) Nenê
- (Serbia) Milan Rakić
- (Serbia) Vladimir Lazić
- (Serbia) Nenad Krstić
- (Serbia) Jovan Đorđević
- (Serbia) Marko Pršić
- (Serbia) Nenad Roknić
- (Serbia) Nikola Matijević
- (Serbia) Aleksandar Živanović
- (Bosnia and Herzegovina) Slaven Novoselac
- (Serbia) Vladimir Milosavac
- (Serbia) Aleksa Antonić
- (Serbia) Nikola Ranisavljević
- (Serbia) Nikola Josimović
- (Serbia) Dražen Novoselac
- (Serbia) Vladimir Popović
- (Serbia) Davor Stanković
- (Croatia) Željko Petrović
- (Serbia) Boris Čizmar
- (Costa Rica) Aarón Jeréz (Aarón Jerez)
- (Serbia) Dražen Arvaji
- (Georgia (country)) David Kepashvili (David Kepaschwili) or (Dato Kefashvili)
- (Serbia) Nemanja Kovačević

== Coaching history ==
- (Serbia) Dragan Milačić
- (Serbia) Dejan Knežević
- (Serbia) Aca Kovačević
- (Serbia) Dejan Majes
