= Predrag Brzaković =

Serbian football and futsal player

Personal information
- Full name: Predrag Brzaković
- Date of birth: 27 September 1964
- Place of birth: Belgrade, SR Serbia, SFR Yugoslavia
- Date of death: 14 September 2012 (aged 47)
- Place of death: Belgrade, Serbia
- Height: 1.86 m (6 ft 1 in)
- Position: Goalkeeper

Youth career
- Radnički Beograd

Senior career*
Years	Team	Apps	(Gls)
1986–1990	OFK Beograd	79	(0)
1991–1992	Vojvodina	59	(0)
1993–1994	Radnički Beograd	17	(0)
1994–1995	Enosis Neon Paralimni		
1995–1999	Čukarički	99	(0)
2000	Qingdao Hainiu	26	(0)
2001–2002	Zvezdara		
Total		280	(0)
- * Club domestic league appearances and goals

Predrag "Peca" Brzaković (Serbian Cyrillic: Предраг Пеца Брзаковић; 27 September 1964 – 14 September 2012) was a Serbian professional footballer who played as a goalkeeper.

== Club career ==
After starting out at Radnički Beograd, Brzaković played for OFK Beograd in the Yugoslav Second League over the course of five seasons, before switching to Yugoslav First League side Vojvodina in the 1991 winter transfer window. He spent two years in Novi Sad before rejoining his parent club Radnički Beograd during the winter break of the 1992–93 season. Between 1995 and 1998, Brzaković made 99 appearances for Čukarički in the First League of FR Yugoslavia. He also played professionally in Cyprus and China.

== International career ==
In April 1996, Brzaković was an unused substitute in FR Yugoslavia's 3–1 home victory over the Faroe Islands.

== Futsal career ==
After retiring from football, Brzaković played futsal for Serbia's Marbo and Ekonomac, but also for Montenegro's Municipium. He represented Serbia at the 2007 UEFA Futsal Championship, aged 43.

== Death ==
On 14 September 2012, Brzaković suddenly died due to a heart attack.

== Career statistics ==
Club	Season	League	
Club	Season	Apps	Goals
OFK Beograd	1986–87	3	0
OFK Beograd	1987–88	26	0
OFK Beograd	1988–89	5	0
OFK Beograd	1989–90	27	0
OFK Beograd	1990–91	18	0
OFK Beograd	Total	79	0
Vojvodina	1990–91	13	0
Vojvodina	1991–92	31	0
Vojvodina	1992–93	15	0
Vojvodina	Total	59	0
Radnički Beograd	1992–93	14	0
Radnički Beograd	1993–94	3	0
Radnički Beograd	Total	17	0
Čukarički	1995–96	36	0
Čukarički	1996–97	32	0
Čukarički	1997–98	31	0
Čukarički	Total	99	0
Qingdao Hainiu	2000	26	0
Career total		280	0
