= HFC Zrinjski Mostar =

- Full name: Hrvatski Futsal Club Zrinjski Mostar
- Founded: 2009; 16 years ago
- Ground: Bijeli Brijeg Hall, Mostar
- Capacity: 1,000
- Chairman: Dalibor Drlje
- Manager: Danijel Karačić
- League: Premier League
- 2020-21: 9th
Home colours	Away colours

Hrvatski Futsal Club Zrinjski Mostar is a futsal club from Mostar, Bosnia and Herzegovina. It competes in Premier Futsal League of Bosnia and Herzegovina. The club is part of the Zrinjski Mostar sport society.

== History ==
The club was founded in 2009 under the name MNK Comunicare. In September 2013, it was renamed MNK Zrinjski and finally in 2018 to HFC Zrinjski. In the season 2009–10. they won the Second League of Federation of Bosnia and Herzegovina, thus achieving promotion to the First League of Federation of Bosnia and Herzegovina which they won in the season 2011–12. In 2018 Zrinjski won the national cup title. The team played in the top tier Premier Futsal League of Bosnia and Herzegovina until the 2020–21 season when they were relegated to the second tier.

== Honours ==
- Premier Futsal League of Bosnia and Herzegovina:
  - Runner-up (1): 2018-19
- First League of Federation of Bosnia and Herzegovina:
  - Winners (1): 2011–12
- Second League of Federation of Bosnia and Herzegovina:
  - Winners (1): 2009–10
- Bosnia and Herzegovina Futsal Cup:
  - Winners (1): 2018-19
  - Runner-up (1): 2020-21

== Coaching history ==
- Vladimir Vladisavljević
- Daniel Karačić
