= Nenê (futsal player) =

Brazilian futsal player

Personal information
- Full name: João Carlos Gonçalves Filho
- Date of birth: 9 November 1983 (age 42)
- Place of birth: São Paulo, Brazil
- Height: 1.74 m (5 ft 8 1/2 in)
- Position: Pivot

Senior career*
Years	Team	Apps	(Gls)
2005–2008	Sporting CP		
2009	CSKA Moscow		
2009–2011	Nacional Zagreb		
2011–2012	Action 21		
2012–2014	Benfica		
2014–2015	Ekonomac Kragujevac		
2016–2017	APOEL		
- * Club domestic league appearances and goals as of June 2015

João Carlos Gonçalves Filho (born 9 November 1983), known as Nenê, is a Brazilian futsal player who plays as a pivot.

== Career ==
Born in São Paulo, Nenê arrived in European futsal at the hands of Sporting CP coach, Paulo Fernandes. He spent three years there, winning one league in his first year, and two Portuguese cups in the remaining two.

In 2008, he left Sporting and moved to the Russian league, joining MFK CSKA Moscow, without winning any silverware. He then spent two years at Nacional Zagreb, winning both a league and a national cup.

After one year in Belgium, at Action 21, Paulo Fernandes, now at Benfica, brought him to the club on 28 July 2012. In Lisbon, he only won one supercup over two seasons, so he was released on 19 June 2014, together with Joel Queirós and Marcão. Afterwards, he played with Serbian club KMF Ekonomac Kragujevac, and Cypriot clube APOEL.

== Honours ==
Sporting CP

- Liga Portuguesa de Futsal: 2005–06
- Taça de Portugal de Futsal: 2005–06, 2007–08

Nacional Zagreb

- Croatian Prva HMNL: 2009–10

SL Benfica

- SuperTaça de Futsal de Portugal: 2012

Ekonomac

- Serbian Prva Futsal Liga: 2015
