= 2022–23 Croatian Futsal Cup =

Croatian Futsal Cup
- Dates: 28 October 2022 – 20 February 2023
- Champions: Futsal Pula
- Matches played: 28
- Goals scored: 169 (6.04 per match)
- All statistics correct as of 20 February 2023.

The 2022–23 Croatian Futsal Cup is the 30th season of the Croatian Futsal Cup, the national cup for men's futsal teams in Croatia, since its establishment in 1993.

== Calendar ==
| Round | Number of fixtures | Clubs | New entries this round |
|---|---|---|---|
| Round of 32 | 16 | 32 → 16 | 32 |
| Round of 16 | 8 | 16 → 8 | none |
| Quarter-finals | 4 | 8 → 4 | none |
| Semi-finals | 2 | 4 → 2 | none |
| Final | 1 | 2 → 1 | none |

== Round of 32 ==
The pairs of the round of 16 were announced on 13 October after draw. Games were played between 28 and 30 October 2022, except of games including Novo Vrijeme and Futsal Pula due their games in UEFA Futsal Champions League.

| Date | Home team | Score | Away team | Ref. |
|---|---|---|---|---|
| 28 Oct | Brod | 1–3 | Rijeka | |
| 28 Oct | Brod 035 | 0–2 | Torcida | |
| 28 Oct | Otočac | 1–3 | Osijek | |
| 28 Oct | Futsal Dinamo | 5–1 | Jesenje | |
| 28 Oct | Vrgorac | 5–2 | Kijevo | |
| 29 Oct | Square | 4–2 | Jezera | |
| 29 Oct | Aurelia | 2–3 | Uspinjača Gimka | |
| 29 Oct | Futsal Gorica | 5–5 (5–6 p) | Šibenik 1983 | |
| 29 Oct | Split | 7–1 | Pakoštane | |
| 29 Oct | Olmissum | 0–3 (awd)^{1} | Bjelovar | |
| 30 Oct | Petrinjčica | 7–4 | Vinkovci | |
| 30 Oct | Murter | 7–3 | Universitas | |
| 15 Nov | Novo Vrijeme | 7–0 | Novi Marof | |
| 15 Nov | Futsal Pula | 4–0 | Porto Tolero | |
| Not played | Crnica | 3–0 (w.o.) | Našice | |
| Not played | Alumnus Sesvete | 0–3 (w.o.) | Nova Gradiška | |

1 Olmissum originally won the game 15–0, but it was later disqualified due to the participation of three players under penalty of the third yellow card.

== Round of 16 ==
The pairs of the round of 16 were announced on 10 November after draw, except of games including Novo Vrijeme and Futsal Pula due their games in UEFA Futsal Champions League.

| Date | Home team | Score | Away team | Ref. |
|---|---|---|---|---|
| 25 Nov | Futsal Dinamo | 7–4 | Nova Gradiška | |
| 25 Nov | Vrgorac | 2–2 (8–9 p) | Šibenik 1983 | |
| 25 Nov | Osijek | 3–6 | Torcida | |
| 26 Nov | Bjelovar | 2–1 | Petrinjčica | |
| 26 Nov | Uspinjača Gimka | 1–3 | Crnica | |
| 27 Nov | Murter | 1–1 (4–2 p) | Split | |
| 6 Dec | Futsal Pula | 4–2 | Square | |
| 6 Dec | Novo Vrijeme | 5–1 | Rijeka | |

== Final Eight ==
On 20 January 2023 it was decided that Futsal Dinamo will be hosting the Final Eight tournament in Zagreb. The quarter-finals draw was held on 25 January 2023, the semi-finals draw will be held after the quarter-finals.

=== Quarter-finals ===
17 February 2023
13:00

| Murter | 4–4 | Torcida |
|---|---|---|
| Anić 2'; A. Marić 35' (og); Celić 39'; Popov 40' | Report | Repić 2' 3' 19'; D. Marić 19' |
Penalties
| Anić (penalty scored); Celić (penalty scored); Nadoveza (penalty scored) | 3–0 | (penalty missed) Mišerda; (penalty missed) Zorotović; (penalty missed) A. Marić |

Dom Sportova, Hall 2, Zagreb
Attendance: 50
Referee: Boris Stanić, Mario Blažin

17 February 2023
15:15

| Futsal Pula | 3–0 | Crnica |
|---|---|---|
| Ramić 13'; Prelčec 35'; Bilić 40' | Report |

Dom Sportova, Hall 2, Zagreb
Attendance: 100
Referee: Mislav Džeko, Dino Kramar

17 February 2023
17:45

| Bjelovar | 0–3 | Novo Vrijeme |
|---|---|---|
| | Report | Jeferson 8'; Ferreira Lima 24'; Bašković 32' |

Dom Sportova, Hall 2, Zagreb
Attendance: 150
Referee: Krešimir Grgurević, Duje Marinković

17 February 2023
20:15

| Futsal Dinamo | 3–3 | Šibenik 1983 |
|---|---|---|
| Zonjić 20'; F. Novak 37'; Šućur 40' | Report | Almeida 1'; Monteiro 11' 35' |
Penalties
| Perić (penalty scored); T. Novak (penalty scored); Čekol (penalty missed); Šućur (penalty missed); F. Novak (penalty missed) | 2–3 | (penalty scored) Bajrušović; (penalty scored) Žumberac; (penalty scored) Ćorluka; (penalty missed) Protega |

Dom Sportova, Hall 2, Zagreb
Attendance: 800
Referee: Mateo Šimunov, Mario Budimir

=== Semi-finals ===
19 February 2023
17:00

| Futsal Pula | 6–3 | Murter |
|---|---|---|
| Da. Moravac 4' 40'; Bilić 6'; Mataja 24' 27' 39' | Report | Popov 5' 18'; Ćoran 14' |

Dom Sportova, Hall 2, Zagreb
Attendance: 200
Referee: Vedran Babić, Dino Kramar

19 February 2023
20:00

| Novo Vrijeme | 2–2 | Šibenik 1983 |
|---|---|---|
| Jefferson 16'; Rafinha 34' | Report | Jurković 33'; Badrov 35' |
Penalties
| Kazazić (penalty missed); Rafinha (penalty missed); Jelavić (penalty missed) | 0–3 | (penalty scored) Bajrušović; (penalty scored) Žumberac; (penalty scored) Protega |

Dom Sportova, Hall 2, Zagreb
Attendance: 200
Referee: Nikola Jelić, Mislav Džeko

=== Final ===
20 February 2023
18:30

| Futsal Pula | 5–2 | Šibenik 1983 |
|---|---|---|
| Difonzo 19'; Mataja 27'; Osredkar 28' 38'; Vukmir 35' | Report | Almeida 36'; Bilić 40' (og) |

Dom Sportova, Hall 2, Zagreb
Attendance: 400
Referee: Nikola Jelić, Vedran Babić
