= 2021 Croatian Futsal Cup =

Croatian Futsal Cup
- Dates: September 2021(qualifications) – December 2021(final stage)
- Champions: Novo Vrijeme Apfel
- All statistics correct as of 11 December 2021.

The 2021 Croatian Futsal Cup is the 29th season of the Croatian Futsal Cup, the national cup for men's futsal teams in Croatia, since its establishment in 1993.

== Calendar ==
Stage	Round	Number of fixtures	Clubs	New entries this round
Regional	Preliminary	9	46 → 37	18
Regional	Quarter-finals	12	37 → 25	15
Regional	Semi-finals	6	25 → 19	none
Regional	Final	3	19 → 16	none
Final	Round of 16	8	16 → 8	13
Final	Quarter-finals	4	8 → 4	none
Final	Semi-finals	2	4 → 2	none
Final	Final	1	2 → 1	none

== Regional stage ==
Regional staged include three regions, each playing its own cup where the winner will be qualifies for round of 16 final stage.

=== East Region Cup ===
The East Region Cup was played by 10 clubs from Slavonia.

Date	Home team	Score	Away team	Source
Preliminary round
3 Oct	Vinkovci učilište Studium	5–4	Slatina	
4 Oct	Brod	6–2	Futsal Olimpijac	
Quarter-finals
13 Oct	Mala mljekara	1–6	Osijek	
6 Oct	Autodijelovi Tokić	10–7	Jakšić	
13 Oct	Vinkovci učilište Studium	5–2	Sveti Patrik	
14 Oct	Brod	1–9	Nova Gradiška	
Semi-finals
20 Oct	Osijek	22–1	Autodijelovi Tokić	
21 Oct	Nova Gradiška	10–0	Vinkovci učilište Studium	
Final
27 Oct	Osijek	7–8	Nova Gradiška	

=== South Region Cup ===
The South Region Cup was played by 13 clubs from Dalmatia.

Date	Home team	Score	Away team	Source
Preliminary round
28 Sep	Murter	1–3	Kijevo	
28 Sep	Jezera	2–2 (4–3p)	Heroji 2007	
28 Sep	Genius	2–7	Torcida	
30 Sep	Bačvice	6–4	Mejaši	
3 Oct	Hajduk	3–9	Trogir	
Quarter-finals
5 Oct	Kijevo	9–5	Bačvice	
5 Oct	Ombla	0–5	Torcida	
6 Oct	Šibenik 1983	10–3	Jezera	
6 Oct	Universitas	9–1	Trogir	
Semi-finals
20 Oct	Kijevo	5–4	Šibenik 1983	
20 Oct	Torcida	1–2	Universitas	
Final
2 Nov	Universitas	9–2	Kijevo	

=== West Region Cup ===
The West Region Cup was played by 10 clubs from Northern, Western and Central Croatia.

Date	Home team	Score	Away team	Source
Preliminary round
6 Oct	Škurinje NN	5–0	Novi Marof	
6 Oct	Futsal Gorica	3–6	Futsal Pula	
Quarter-finals
13 Oct	Siscia	5–9	Futsal Pula	
13 Oct	Bjelovar	11–4	Škurinje NN	
13 Oct	Zagreb 92	1–5	Otočac	
12 Oct	Rijeka	9–5	Jesenje	
Semi-finals
19 Oct	Rijeka	10–6	Bjelovar	
20 Oct	Otočac	1–8	Futsal Pula	
Final
2 Nov	Futsal Pula	11–2	Rijeka	

== Round of 16 ==
The pairs of the round of 16 were announced after the end of the regional cups.

Date	Home team	Score	Away team	Source
17 Nov	Nova Gradiška	6–2	Split	
13 Nov	Universitas	4–4 (8–7p)	Vrgorac	
24 Nov	Futsal Pula	2–6	Olmissum	
13 Nov	Crnica	4–2	Uspinjača Gimka	
12 Nov	Square	6–2	Alumnus Sesvete	
n/a	Našice	w.o.	Novo Vrijeme Apfel	
17 Nov	Brod 035	1–7	Futsal Dinamo	
12 Nov	Petrinjčica	0–6	Aurelia Futsal	

== Quarter-finals ==
The quarter-finals draw was held on 25 November 2021.

Date	Home team	Score	Away team	Source
1 Dec	Square	5–2	Nova Gradiška	
30 Nov	Universitas	2–3	Novo Vrijeme Apfel	
27 Nov	Olmissum	5–3	Futsal Dinamo	
30 Nov	Crnica	5–3	Aurelia Futsal	

== Final four ==
The semi-finals draw was held on 6 December 2021 at 14:00 CET. On 28 November 2021 it was decided that Pula will be hosting the Final four tournament.

=== Semi-finals ===
10 December 2021
16:00

Olmissum	4–4 (a.e.t.)	Square
Pavić 11' 38'; Postružin 16'; Hrstić 27'	Report	Duvančić 14'; Hrstić 37' (og); Đuraš 39'; Cvjetković 39'
Penalties
Juretić (penalty scored); Kustura (penalty missed); Horvat (penalty scored); Jurlina (penalty scored); Kolobarić (penalty scored)	4–3	(penalty missed) Kuraja; (penalty scored) Cvjetković; (penalty scored) Đuraš; (penalty scored) Duvančić; (penalty missed) Šimunović

Mate Parlov Sport Centre, Pula
Attendance: 100
Referee: Josip Dujmić, Mislav Džeko
10 December 2021
20:00

Crnica	5–6	Novo Vrijeme Apfel
Škugor 1'; Katuša 2' 5'; Popov 34'; Subotić 37'	Report	Jelavić 8'; Suton 11' 25' 25'; Gašpar 26'; Horvath 31'

Mate Parlov Sport Centre, Pula
Attendance: 100
Referee: Nikola Jelić, Dino Kramar

=== Final ===
11 December 2021
19:00

Olmissum	2–6	Novo Vrijeme Apfel
Marić 30' 35'	Report	Jelavić 6' 22' 28'; Suton 7' 24'; Horvath 40'

Mate Parlov Sport Centre, Pula
Attendance: 100
Referee: Nikola Jelić, Vedran Babić
