= Futsal in Australia =

- Country: Australia
- Governing body: Football Federation Australia
- National team: Australia
- Nickname: Futsalroos
- First played: 1970

International competitions
- FIFA Futsal World Cup; Women's Futsal World Tournament; AFC Futsal Asian Cup; AFC Futsal Club Championship; AFF Futsal Championship; OFC Futsal Championship; Commonwealth Futsal Cup

Futsal in Australia is governed by the Football Federation Australia and its state-based futsal associations. Australia has played in seven FIFA Futsal World Cups.

== History ==
In 1970, the first competitive indoor soccer game was played in Australia at the YMCA Sporting Complex in Epping, Sydney. It was introduced by Edwin (Eddie) Palmer, a new immigrant, who had recently arrived from East Africa.

In 1971, Dawn Gilligan, Jack Bowder and a few parents of the players taking part in the inaugural competition, took a team to Revesby YMCA. It was played due a wet in the winter football season, which closed outdoor grounds for many weeks. Gilligan and then manager of the YMCA, Joe Brent wrote to England to obtain official rules and the game spread to other YMCAs. The following year the game of futsal, which at the time was experiencing worldwide growth, was introduced in the Revesby YMCA, and adapted as a competitive competition for the new season. The popularity of the sport saw it slowly spread to the other states.

In 1977, Brent became first president of the Australian Indoor Soccer Association, which affiliated with FIFUSA two years later. The first national championships took place in Melbourne in 1980.

== Futsal Leagues Pyramid ==
The F-League served as the top-tier futsal league in Australia until its discontinuation in 2017. Since then, the top-tier futsal leagues in each state have effectively assumed the highest position in the overall Australian futsal league pyramid.

The National Futsal Championship is a national tournament in which selected players from each state represent their respective state teams. This competition is not a club league but an inter-state representative tournament.

Similarly, the Series Futsal Australia National Cup, which features top teams from each state competing against one another, is a cup-style competition rather than a league. Both tournaments are among the most significant futsal competitions in Australia, but neither forms part of the formal league pyramid.

== Men's Futsal Pyramid ==
The national futsal pyramid varies by state, with promotion and relegation where applicable. Some regional and independent leagues operate in parallel based on competitive level.

Level	Leagues
1	Series Futsal Premiership (VIC) New South Wales Premier Futsal League (NSW) Queensland F.League (QLD) Supa Liga (WA) Capital Futsal League (ACT)
2	Series Futsal State League Championship (VIC) New South Wales Premier Futsal League 2 (NSW) Queensland Futsal Premier League (QLD) Supa Liga 2 (WA)
3	Series Futsal State League One (VIC) Supa Liga B (WA)
4	Series Futsal State League Two (VIC) Supa Liga B2 (WA)
5	Series Futsal State League Three (VIC) Victoria East Premier League Division 1 (Eastern VIC) Mount Evelyn Premier Futsal League (Eastern VIC) Sydney Futsal League (NSW) National Southern Cross Futsal League (NSW) Australian Futbol Sala League (NSW) Supa Liga C (WA)
6	Series Futsal State League Four (VIC) Victoria East Premier League Division 2 (Eastern VIC)
7	Victoria East Premier League Division 3 (Eastern VIC)
8	Senior Futsal League Division 1 (ACT)
9	Senior Futsal League Division 2 (ACT)
10	Senior Futsal League Division 3 (ACT)
11	Senior Futsal League Division 4 (ACT)
12	Senior Futsal League Division 5 (ACT)

== Competitions ==
The defunct F-League was the national futsal league in Australia, organized by FNSW. It served as the country’s Tier 1 futsal league until its discontinuation in 2017. Since then, the top-tier leagues in each state have effectively become Tier 1 within their respective regions, collectively representing the highest level of futsal across Australia in the absence of a national futsal league.

By state or territory

=== South Australia ===
In South Australia, the South Australian Futsal League (SAFL) is the state's premier competition. It was established in 2013, and is yet to be affiliated with Football South Australia.

=== Western Australia ===
In Western Australia, the Supa-Liga is the state's premier futsal competition. It is organised by Futsal WA, which operates dedicated futsal programs across multiple locations around the state, and is affiliated with Football West.

The league's top division follows a home-and-away format and features clubs based throughout the Perth metropolitan area. The current champions of the 2025 Winter season are the West Coast Cobras in the men's division and the Cockburn Wolves in the women's division.

Rockingham Cambio Cumbre is the most successful men's futsal club in Western Australia, home to state team captain Tyler Garner and 2025 National Futsal Championships Golden Boot winner Charlie Garnham. Both players have represented the Futsalroos at international level.

In the women’s division, Cockburn Wolves and South Perth Alliance are widely regarded as the two most successful clubs. Each team currently features a national team player: Marianna Tabain of Cockburn Wolves and Zoee Spadano of South Perth Alliance, both of whom play for the Australia women's national futsal team. Cockburn Wolves also feature Judy Connolly, who represents the Philippines women's national futsal team.

=== Queensland ===
Queensland's top division in Futsal is the SEQ Futsal Premier League which is organised by Football Queensland, the states governing Football organisation.

=== Victoria ===
In Victoria, the professional premier Futsal league is known as Series Futsal Victoria organized by Futsal Oz. The Series Futsal lower semi-professional leagues are known as State League Championship, State League One, State League Two, State League Three and State League Four. In the Eastern part of Victoria, the premier Futsal league is known as Pro Futsal Mt Evelyn Premier League which is organized by Pro Futsal Mt Evelyn, a sub-branch of Pro Futsal. Pro Futsal Mt Evelyn is affiliated with Football Victoria. It is also widely considered as the Elite Futsal of the East of Victoria State. Well known clubs such as Le Futsal Club, Eastern Futsal Club and Melbourne Futsal Club have been actively participating in the league since 2022. In the Western part of Victoria, the premier Futsal league is known as AFG Premium League which is organized by Australia Futsal Group and is affiliated with Football Victoria.

The Australian Futsal Association considers itself to be the biggest futsal organisation in Australia which organised competitive state futsal league and national championship tournaments for youths around Australia.

== Futsal OZ ==
Futsal Oz is an elite futsal organization founded by a former Australian Futsal player Peter Parthimos. Its headquarter is located in Brunswick, Victoria and has organised Professional and Semi-Professional Futsal Leagues and Cups tournaments all over of Australia. The first-tier league is the Serie Futsal which comprises six semi-professional futsal leagues in six territories and states. The top clubs of each leagues compete against each other in a three-day elite Futsal tournament called Serie Futsal Australia.

Tier	Leagues					
1	Series Futsal					
1	Series Futsal A.C.T	Series Futsal Queensland	Series Futsal New South Wales	Series Futsal Victoria	Series Futsal South Australia	Series Futsal Western Australia
2	State League Championship					
3	State League One					
4	State League Two					
5	State League Three					
6	State League Four					
Non-Tier	Leagues					
1	Series Futsal Youth League "Developmental League"					
2	Inner City League					

== Pro Futsal ==
Pro Futsal is a private organization that runs Futsal competitions in Western Australia and Victoria State. The competitions consists of Elite, Juniors and Social competitions and the headquarter is located in Mount Evelyn, Victoria. Pro Futsal Perth premium competition is known as the WA State League and Pro Futsal Mt Evelyn is known as Mt Evelyn Premier League.

== National teams ==
The national futsal teams represent Australia in international competition. Australian national teams historically competed in the OFC, though since FFA's move in 2006, Australian teams have competed in AFC competitions.

The Australian futsal team represents Australia at the FIFA Futsal World Cup and the AFC Futsal Asian Cup.

The Australian women's futsal team represents Australia at the Women's Futsal World Tournament and the AFC Women's Futsal Asian Cup.

== See also ==
- Soccer in Australia
