= Croatian Futsal Cup =

- Founded: 1993
- Region: Croatia
- Teams: 16 (final stage)
- Current champions: Novo Vrijeme Apfel (1st title)
- Most championships: Uspinjača Gimka (5 titles)
- Broadcaster: HNTV
- Website: Official website
- 2022–23 Croatian Futsal Cup

The MNK Croatian Futsal Cup (Croatian: Hrvatski malonogometni kup, HMNK), is an annually held football competition for Croatian futsal clubs and is the second most important competition in Croatian futsal after the Prva HMNL. It is governed by the Croatian Football Federation (HNS) and usually runs from September to December.

== Format ==
=== Entries ===
Although in theory any club can take part in the cup, 32 teams enter the competition proper, based on two criteria:

1. Top 27 best-ranked teams according to club coefficient calculated by the Croatian Football Federation which take into account their cup records in the previous five seasons
2. Five winners of regional cups

=== Competition system ===
The cup competition consists of two parts:

- the first part is the regional cup in which clubs that did not win a direct placement in the final part

- the second part is the final part in which the performance of 13 best placed clubs by coefficient and 3 winners of regional cups

Regional level matches are played as single-legged fixtures, and pairs are determined by lot. The matches of the final part of the futsal cup are played in the round of 32, round of 16 and Final eight witch include quarterfinals semifinals and finale, with all round being played as single-legged fixtures. Opponents in all rounds are determined by a draw. The winners of the round of 16 plays the Final eight, with a host being a of the qualified teams. The finals formal host is a club with better ranking according to the coefficient of success.

=== Croatian club cup coefficient ===
Clubs are awarded points for participation in specific round of the Cup, except finals where runner up receives 4 points and winner receives 6 points. Points are summed through the season and added to five year ranking. Points are given according to the table:

Round	Awarded clubs	Points
Each round of regional cup	not defined	1
Semifinals of regional cup	12	2
Finals of regional cup	6	2
Round of 16	16	3
Quarter-finals	8	3
Semi-finals	4	3
Runner up	1	4
Winner	1	6

Points used in this ranking will be used for qualification and seeding for the season 2022–23 as follows:

Rank	Club	2016−17	2017−18	2018−19	2019–20	2020–21	Total
1	Split	13	15	6	9	9	52
2	Vrgorac	6	13	6	9	13	47
3	Olmissum	0	2	9	19	15	45
4	Uspinjača Gimka	3	3	15	15	6	42
5	Alumnus Sesvete	4	6	13	6	6	35
6	Novo Vrijeme Apfel	9	3	9	3	9	33
7	Futsal Dinamo	8	9	3	6	6	32
8	Aurelia Futsal	1	12	3	3	8	27
9	Petrinjčica	6	6	6	6	3	27
10	Brod 035	5	5	5	8	3	26
11	Našice	8	9	3	3	3	26
12	Square	6	3	9	3	3	24
13	Crnica	2	5	4	6	6	23
14	Jesenje	5	2	8	3	3	21
15	Porto Tolero	9	3	3	3	3	21
16	Futsal Pula	0	0	3	8	9	20
17	Jezera	1	4	6	2	4	18
18	Torcida	1	11	4	1	1	18
19	Kijevo	6	3	3	3	1	16
20	Universitas	0	4	1	1	9	15
21	Brod	1	4	3	1	6	15
22	Murter	3	3	2	6	1	15
23	Nova Gradiška	0	0	9	6	0	15
24	Vinkovci	3	1	6	3	1	14
25	Otočac	0	3	1	5	3	12
26	Hajduk	6	1	1	2	2	12
27	Šibenik 1983	0	0	2	2	6	10

== Winners ==
Season	Winner	Runner up
1993–94	Foto Ante Stojan	Petrinjčica
1994–95	Glama Brijeg Aurum	Oktogon Elab
1995–96	Uspinjača Ferax	Petrinjčica Idis
1996–97	Uspinjača Ferax	Split 1700
1997–98	Square	Split 1700
1998–99	Promet Orkan	Square
1999–00	Glama Brijeg Agram	Plehan
2000–01	Split 1700	Square
2001–02	Split 1700	Croatia Perković
2002–03	Split Gašperov	Split Ship Management
2003–04	Orkan	Square
2004–05	Split Gašperov	Orkan Valten Križevci
2005–06	Brodsplit Inženjering Split	Orkan Profectus
2006–07	Uspinjača	Gospić
2007–08	Gospić	Split Brodsplit Inženjering
2008–09	Nacional	Split Brodsplit Inženjering
2009–10	Nacional	Inero Split
2010–11	Split Brodsplit Inženjering	Uspinjača
2011–12	Split Brodsplit Inženjering	Nacional
2012–13	Kijevo	Uspinjača
2013–14	Split Tommy	Square
2014–15	Nacional	Square
2015–16	Split Tommy	Nacional
2016–17	Nacional	Split Tommy
2017–18	Split Tommy	Vrgorac
2018–19	Uspinjača Gimka	Alumnus Sesvete
2019–20	Uspinjača Gimka	Olmissum
2020–21	Olmissum	Vrgorac
2021	Novo Vrijeme Apfel	Olmissum

== See also ==
- Croatia Futsal Cup
- Thailand Futsal Cup
