= KMF Ekonomac =

Serbian futsal club

Ekonomac
- Full name: Klub malog fudbala Ekonomac
- Founded: 7 November 2000 (25 years ago)
- Ground: Hala Jezero
- Capacity: 5,000
- League: Prva Futsal Liga
- 2024–25: Prva Futsal Liga, 6th
- Website: http://www.ekonomac.com
Home colours	Away colours

Klub malog fudbala Ekonomac (Serbian Cyrillic: Клуб малог фудбала Економац), commonly known as Ekonomac Kragujevac (Serbian Cyrillic: Економац Крагујевац), is a Serbian futsal club based in Kragujevac, Serbia. The club is currently competing in the Prva Futsal Liga, which is the premier futsal league in Serbia.

== History ==
=== Early years (2000–2006) ===
Futsal Club Ekonomac was founded on 7 November 2000 by a group of students from the Faculty of Economics of the university of University of Kragujevac; with professor Veroljub Dugalić at its front along with a group of his university colleagues. The club started competing in the lowest futsal league of Serbia at that time, with the goal of popularization of this sport at the university and in Kragujevac. During the next year the club made a big success and, with the reinforcement of new players, qualified to play in what was at that time known as the Republic League of Serbia. Since the 2004–05 season Ekonomac is competing in the highest league ranking.

=== Golden years (2006–2015) ===
In the 2006–07 season Ekonomac finished as runners-up in the national league. In 2008, Ekonomac won the Balkan Cup and two months later, they won their first Serbian championship. In the following seasons (2009–10, 2010–11, and 2011–12), Ekonomac defended the Serbian championship title. In the 2012–13 season Ekonomac won its first national futsal cup of Serbia. By winning the national championship in the same season, 2012–13, Ekonomac became the most successful futsal club of all time in Serbia. As the most successful futsal club in the history of this sport in the country, Ekonomac continued with what might be the club's best season so far, by winning the championship in the 2013–14 season with an undefeated record (only one draw). In the 2014–15 season, Ekonomac won the Serbian championship again as well as reaching the elite round of the UEFA Futsal Cup.

== UEFA Futsal Cup ==
The club made its first appearance in the UEFA Futsal Cup in 2008 when they reached the elite round. They qualified as the Serbian champions and started the competition in the main round. Ekonomac set a large list of records in its eight appearances in the UEFA Futsal Cup, being the only Serbian futsal club who participated eight times. The club also reached the elite round every time it participated in UEFA competitions.

=== UEFA Ranking ===
By frequently participating in the UEFA Futsal Cup, Ekonomac was ranked high in the UEFA club ranking list. In 2015, when UEFA published the new futsal club ranking list, KMF Ekonomac was ranked as the fourth futsal club in Europe with 21,000 points. With this new ranking, Ekonomac qualified directly to the elite round for the 2015–16 season, thus setting a new record for Serbian futsal. The club became the highest-ranked Serbian futsal team in the history, and is also the only Serbian futsal club who has qualified directly to the elite round.

== Players and Head Coaches ==
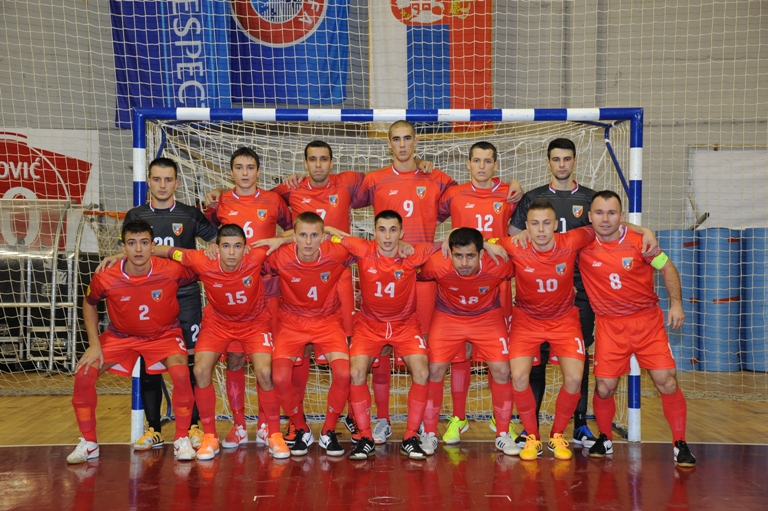
KMF Ekonomac in the 2014–15 season

=== National and International Players ===
List of notable national and international players who played for Ekonomac.

- (Serbia) Vidan Bojović
- (Serbia) Predrag Brzaković
- (Serbia) Miodrag Aksentijević
- (Serbia) Vladan Vesić
- (Serbia) Predrag Rajić
- (Serbia) Đorđe Jovanović
- (Serbia) Mladen Kocić
- (Serbia) Slobodan Rajčević
- (Serbia) Borko Surudžić
- (Serbia) Miloš Simić
- (Serbia) Slobodan Janjić
- (Serbia) Vladimir Ranisavljević
- (Serbia) Stefan Rakić
- (Serbia) Milan Živić
- (Serbia) Vladimir Lazić
- (Serbia) Jovan Lazarević
- (Serbia) Marko Radovanović
- (Serbia) Marko Novaković
- (Serbia) Aleksa Antonić
- (Serbia) Ivan Stojanović
- (Serbia) Simeun Kopanja
- (Serbia) Kosta Marković
- (Serbia) Dušan Nikolić
- (Serbia) Dušan Rakić
- (Azerbaijan) Vitaliy Borisov
- (Croatia) Franko Bilić
- (Croatia) Jakov Grcić
- (Ukraine) Dmytro Sorokin
- (Slovenia) Alen Fetić
- (North Macedonia) Zoran Leveski
- (North Macedonia) Daniel Marinho de Souza "Dandan"

=== Captains ===
Vidan Bojović has been the captain of Ekonomac for 15 years, from 2000 to 2015, which is also a club record of one player being the caption for such a long period of time. The 2015–16 season started with a new captain, Miloš Simić, who is the youngest captain in the history of Ekonomac.

Years	Captain
2000–2015	(Serbia) Vidan Bojović
2015–2016	(Serbia) Miloš Simić
2016–2019	(Serbia) Nikola Rnić

=== Head coaches ===
- (Serbia) Ivan Božović (2001–2013)
- (Serbia) Vladan Cvetanović (2013–March 2016)
- (Serbia) Predrag Rajić (March 2016–July 2019)

== Colours ==
In the original club constitution, Ekonomac's colours were named as orange and white, but during the years the club colours changed but were always based on the orange colour.

=== Historical kits ===
2007–08 season
2011–12 season
2014–15 season

== Honours ==
=== National ===
- Prva Futsal Liga (11): 2008, 2010, 2011, 2012, 2013, 2014, 2015, 2016, 2017, 2018, 2019
- Serbian Futsal Cup (5): 2013, 2014, 2017, 2018, 2019

=== International ===
- Balkan Cup (1): 2008

== Statistics ==
=== Season-by-season record ===
Season	Rank	P	W	D	L	F	A	GD	Pts	Cup	UEFA
2005–06	5	18	9	1	8	72	67	+5	28	QF	—
▲2006–07	2	22	14	2	6	92	63	+29	44	—	—
▲2007–08	1	22	19	0	3	120	52	+68	57	—	Elite round
▼2008–09	2	22	16	1	5	125	60	+65	49	—	—
▲2009–10	1	23	19	1	3	136	45	+91	58	—	—
2010–11	1	26	24	1	1	191	48	+143	73	▲SF	Elite round
2011–12	1	28	27	0	1	182	36	+146	81	▲Runner-up	Elite round
2012–13	1	18	15	2	1	95	29	+66	47	▲Won	Elite round
2013–14	1	18	17	1	0	122	19	+103	52	Won	Elite round
2014–15	1	22	20	1	1	123	34	+89	61	▼Runner-up	Elite round
2015–16	1	22	19	1	2	145	37	+108	58	Runner-up	Elite round
2016–17	1	22	19	3	0	152	51	+101	60	▲Won	Elite round
2017–18	1	22	22	0	0	171	34	+137	66	Won	Elite round
2018–19	1	22	20	0	2	157	36	+121	60	Won	Elite round
▼2019–20	8	14	3	2	9	35	56	-21	11	N/A	-
▼2020–21	10 (R)	18	4	2	12	35	66	-31	14	N/A	-

Rank = Rank in the "Prva Futsal Liga Srbije"; P = Played; W = Win; D = Draw; L = Loss; F = Goals for; A = Goals against; GD = Goal difference; Pts = Points; Cup = Serbian Futsal Cup; SF = Semifinals; QF = Quarterfinal; UEFA = UEFA Futsal Cup / UEFA Futsal Champions League; (R) = Relegation.
In the 2005–06 season, Ekonomac played in the SCG Serbian Futsal League (Serbia and Montenegro).
In the 2014–15 season, Ekonomac qualified directly to the UEFA Futsal Cup elite round.
In the 2019–20 season, the national league was finished early due to the COVID-19 pandemic, while the national cup was not completed.

=== UEFA club coefficient rankings ===
As of 2016

Pos.	Team	Points
5	(Portugal) Sporting CP	26.166
6	(Azerbaijan) Araz Naxçivan	20.501
7	(Serbia) Ekonomac	20.000
8	(Czech Republic) EP Chrudim	19.001
9	(Hungary) ETO Győr	14.168
