= Primera Divisió (futsal) =

- Founded: 1995
- Country: Andorra
- Confederation: UEFA
- Number of clubs: 13
- Level on pyramid: 1
- Relegation to: Segona Divisió
- International cup(s): UEFA Futsal Cup
- Current champions: FC Encamp
- Most championships: FC Encamp (8)
- Current: Current Season at UEFA.com

The Primera Divisió de Futsal is the premier futsal league in Andorra. The league is played under UEFA rules and organized by Andorran Football Federation, currently consists of 10 teams.

== Champions ==
Season	Winner
1995/96	FC Rànger's
1996/97	FC Rànger's
1997/98	Assegurances Doval
1998/99	Assegurances Doval
1999/00	FS Ranger's Pizzeria Venecia
2000/01	Buick Encamp
2001/02	UE Santa Coloma
2002/03	UE Santa Coloma
2003/04	FS Cap de Carrer
2004/05	FS Cap de Carrer
2005/06	Gran Valira Encamp
2006/07	Gran Valira Encamp
2007/08	DDS Madriu
2008/09	DDS Madriu
2009/10	FC Encamp
2010/11	FC Encamp
2011/12	FC Encamp
2012/13	FC Encamp
2013/14	FC Encamp
2014/15	FC Encamp
2015/16	FC Encamp
2016/17	FC Encamp

== See also ==
- Primera Divisió
- Andorran Football Federation
