= KMF Deus =

Serbian futsal club

- Full name: Klub malog fudbala Deus
- Founded: 2010
- Ground: SPC Pinki; Sremska Mitrovica, Serbia
- Capacity: 2,500
Home colours	Away colours

Klub malog fudbala Deus (Serbian Cyrillic: Клуб малог фудбала Деус) was a Serbian futsal club based in Sremska Mitrovica, Serbia.
