= Boban Ilić =

Serbian sculptor

Boban Ilić (Serbian Cyrillic: Бобан Илић; born 21 January 1963), often known simply as Boban, is a Serbian sculptor best known for his works composed of stainless steel spoons. He now resides in Chicago, Illinois.

== Biography ==
Born in Nis, Serbia, Boban studied under Nandor Glid at the University of Arts in Belgrade, graduating in 1988. Between 1986 and 1990, he exhibited his sculptures in galleries across Europe. In 1991, at the outbreak of the Yugoslav Wars, Boban immigrated to the United States and settled in Chicago. Since then, his works have been exhibited in the United States, Jamaica, Japan, and the Philippines. Boban's sculpture "Renaissance Man" was installed in Chicago's Lincoln Park in 2003. Also in 2003, Boban's sculptures of a lioness and her cub were installed in Chicago's Cummings Playground, again in Lincoln Park. Boban has been featured in several PBS WTTW television programs.

== Exhibitions ==
- 2005 - ArtExpo New York
- 2003 - Lincoln Park Art Initiative, Chicago, Illinois (awarded First Place)
- 2003 - ArtExpo New York
- 2002 - Makati Shangri-La, Grand Art Gallery, Manila, Philippines
- 2001 - Toyamura International Sculpture Biennale, Sapporo, Japan (awarded Best of Show)
- 1998-1999 - Chicago Art and Design Show
- 1996-2000 - Annual Port Clinton Art Festival, Highland Park, Illinois (Award of Excellency, 1998)
- 1992-1999 - Annual Old Orchard Art Festival, Skokie, Illinois (First Place for Sculptural Design, 1992)
