= Aleksandar Živanović (futsal player) =

Serbian futsal player

Personal information
- Full name: Aleksandar Živanović
- Date of birth: 24 July 1988 (age 38)
- Place of birth: SFR Yugoslavia
- Position: Defender

Team information
- Current team: Club Aamal Sportif Bickfaya (Lebanon)

International career
Years	Team	Apps	(Gls)
- Serbia

Aleksandar Živanović (born 24 July 1988), is a Serbian futsal player who plays for Marbo Intermezzo and the Serbia national futsal team.
