= Caio Japa =

Brazilian futsal player

Personal information
- Full name: Caio Takeo Kumahara
- Date of birth: 29 September 1983 (age 43)
- Place of birth: Brazil
- Height: 1.74 m (5 ft 9 in)
- Position: Universal

Team information
- Current team: Maritime Augusta

Senior career*
Years	Team	Apps	(Gls)
–2007	Caxias do Sul		
2007–2009	Belenenses		
2009–2018	Sporting CP	254	(87)
2018–	Maritime Augusta		
- * Club domestic league appearances and goals as of 00:00, 7 August 2018 (UTC)

Caio Takeo Kumahara (born 29 September 1983), commonly known as Caio Japa, is a Brazilian futsal player of Japanese descent who plays for Maritime Augusta in the Italian Serie A.

He scored 109 goals in 346 matches for Sporting CP.
