= MNK Seljak Livno =

MNK Seljak
- Full name: Malonogometni klub Seljak Livno
- Founded: 1979
- Ground: SD Dalibor Perković Dali, Livno
- Capacity: 400
- Chairman: Marko Brčić
- Manager: Božo Crnjak
- League: Premier League
- 2016-17: Premier League, 9th

MNK Seljak Livno is a futsal club from Livno, Bosnia and Herzegovina. It competes in Premier Futsal League of Bosnia and Herzegovina, the top flight of Bosnian-Herzegovinian futsal.

== History ==
Club played in Yugoslavian futsal league and reached stars in last years of Yugoslavia. First, in 1989–90 season club reached final and lost to Uspinjača Zagreb 2–0, in final played in Srijemska Mitrovica.

=== Biggest achievement ===
Next year, Seljak qualified to final once again, and once again Uspinjača was the opponent. This time Seljak won 1-0 and revenged for loss in previous year. Final was played in Zagreb, Uspinjača's home. This was last season of Yugoslavian league.

=== European elite ===
In 1991, Seljak took part in Futsal European Clubs Championship, held in Madrid. After defeating Italian side Roma RCB 7–5, Seljak lost to Portuguese champion Freixeiro 6-4 and finished second in group. In semifinal Seljak lost 10–2 to Interviu Lloyd's, now known as Inter Movistar. In third-place match Seljak defeated Hungarian champion Magyar Mugy 11–7.

=== Bosnia and Herzegovina ===
After Yugoslavia breakup, Seljak started to play in Bosnia and Herzegovina leagues. It won three titles of Federation of Bosnia and Herzegovina League, in 2003, 2006 and 2007, also winning the Cup in 2001.

==== Premier League ====
Since 2013-14 Seljak competes in nationwide Premier League. In 2015 Seljak was Bosnia and Herzegovina Cup runner-up, losing to Zrinjski 4–3 on aggregate.

== Honours ==
=== Domestic competitions ===
- First League of Federation of Bosnia and Herzegovina:
  - Winners (3): 2003, 2006, 2007
- Bosnia and Herzegovina Futsal Cup:
  - Winners (1): 2001
  - Runner-up (1): 2015

=== European competitions ===
- Futsal European Clubs Championship (now UEFA Futsal Champions League):
  - Third place (1): 1991

== Facilities ==
Seljak plays its home games in Sportska dvorana Dalibor Perković Dali hall named after Dalibor Perković Dali, legendary goalkeeper who was part of Seljak's championship team in 1991. He was killed in war in 1993. The hall can seat 400 people.
