= Anatoli Badretdinov =

Russian futsal player

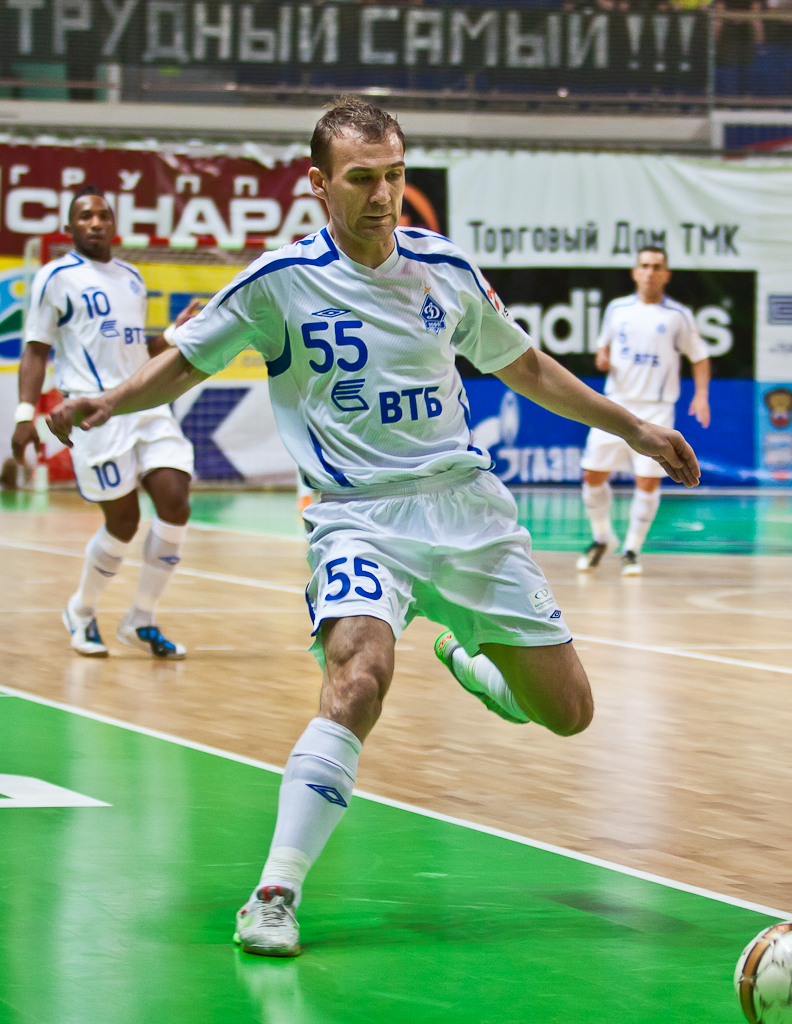

Personal information
- Full name: Anatoli Badretdinov
- Date of birth: 1 September 1984 (age 42)
- Place of birth: Beryozovsky, Sverdlovsk Oblast, Soviet Union
- Position: Cierre

Team information
- Current team: Dinamo Moskva

Senior career*
Years	Team	Apps	(Gls)
2000–2004	UPI-DDT		
2004–2007	Spartak Shelkovo		
2007–	Dinamo Moskva		

International career
–	Russia		
- * Club domestic league appearances and goals

Anatoli Badretdinov (born 1 September 1984), is a Russian futsal player who plays for Dinamo Moskva and the Russian national futsal team.
