= Serbian Prva Futsal Liga =

- Official logo
- Founded: 1988; 38 years ago
- Country: Serbia
- Confederation: UEFA
- Number of clubs: 10
- Level on pyramid: 1
- International cup: UEFA Futsal Cup
- Current champions: Loznica Grad 2018 (4th title) (2025–26)
- Most championships: Ekonomac (11 titles)
- Website: fss.rs/takmicenje/futsal-prva-liga-25-26/

Prva Futsal Liga (Serbian Cyrillic: Прва Футсал Лига) is the premier futsal league in Serbia. It is governed by the Football Association of Serbia and it is played under UEFA and FIFA rules. It was founded in 1988 and as of the incumbent (2025–26) season, the league consists of 10 teams.

== 2025–26 clubs ==
As of 2025–26 season, the following clubs participate in the competition:

Club	City
Ekonomac	Kragujevac
Smederevo	Smederevo
Vojvodina	Novi Sad
Loznica Grad 2018	Loznica
Novi Pazar	Novi Pazar
Hram	Belgrade
Licej	Belgrade
SAS	Zrenjanin
Vranje	Vranje
Winter sport	Niš

== List of champions ==
Serbia
Season	Champions	Runners-up	Play-off
2025–26	Loznica Grad 2018 (4)	Smederevo	—
2024–25	Loznica Grad 2018 (3)	FON	—
2023–24	Vranje	Loznica Grad 2018	—
2022–23	Loznica Grad 2018 (2)	Ekonomac Kragujevac	3:0 (4:0, 3:1, 5:1)
2021–22	Loznica Grad 2018	FON	3:0 (5:2, 4:3, 8:5)
2020–21	FON	Novi Pazar	3:2 (5:2, 6:5, 4:5, 5:8, 5:3)
2019–20	Red Star Belgrade	Novi Pazar	—
2018–19	Ekonomac Kragujevac (11)	Novi Pazar	8:2
2017–18	Ekonomac Kragujevac (10)	Nova Pazova	2:0 (2:1, 6:1)
2016–17	Ekonomac Kragujevac (9)	Euro Motus Belgrade	—
2015–16	Ekonomac Kragujevac (8)	Deus Sremska Mitrovica	—
2014–15	Ekonomac Kragujevac (7)	Bečej	2:0 (2:0, 3:0)
2013–14	Ekonomac Kragujevac (6)	SAS Zrenjanin	—
2012–13	Ekonomac Kragujevac (5)	Marbo Belgrade	—
2011–12	Ekonomac Kragujevac (4)	Marbo Belgrade	—
2010–11	Ekonomac Kragujevac (3)	Marbo Belgrade	—
2009–10	Ekonomac Kragujevac (2)	Kopernikus Niš	—
2008–09	Kolubara Lazarevac	Ekonomac Kragujevac	2:0 (2:1, 11:10^{1})
2007–08	Ekonomac Kragujevac	Liman Novi Sad	2:0 (7:3, 5:3)
2006–07	Marbo Belgrade (4)	Ekonomac Kragujevac	2:0 (5:2, 6:2)

Serbia and Montenegro
Season	Champions	Runner-ups	Play-off
2005–06	Marbo Belgrade (3)	Koska Niš	7:4, 1:1
2004–05	Marbo Belgrade (2)	Municipijum Pljevlja	10:3, 1:2
2003–04	Marbo Belgrade	Konjarnik Belgrade	5:1, 1:2
2002–03	CD Shop Mozzart Danilovgrad (2)	Balestra Nikšić	2:1, 7:3
2001–02	Niš	Gromig Niš	5:4
2000–01	CD Shop Mozzart Danilovgrad	Nikšić	7:2, 8:4
1999–00	Fontana Čačak (2)	Gromig Niš	—
1998–99	Not Finished		
1997–98	Not Played		
1996–97	Fontana Čačak	Elektroprivreda Nikšić	—
1995–96	Elektroprivreda Nikšić	Naisus Niš	—
1994–95	Naisus Niš	Premijer Nikšić	—
1993–94	Premijer Nikšić	Naisus Niš	—
1992–93	Not Played		

Yugoslavia
Season	Champions	Runner-ups	Play-off
1991–92	Davor Sarajevo	Naisus Niš	2:1
1990–91	Seljak Livno	Uspinjača Zagreb	1:0
1989–90	Uspinjača Zagreb	Seljak Livno	2:0
1988–89	Kutina	Seljak Livno	2:1

== Performance by club ==
Note: Only clubs from Serbia are listed below.

Team	Winners	Runners-up	Years won	Years runners-up
Ekonomac	11	3	2008, 2010, 2011, 2012, 2013, 2014, 2015, 2016, 2017, 2018, 2019	2007, 2009, 2023
SAS	4	4	2004, 2005, 2006, 2007	2011, 2012, 2013, 2014
Loznica Grad 2018	4	1	2022, 2023, 2025, 2026	2024
Fontana Čačak	2	—	1997, 2000	—
Naisus Niš	1	3	1995	1992, 1994, 1996
FON	1	2	2021	2022, 2025
Kalča Niš	1	1	2002	2006
Kolubara Lazarevac	1	—	2009	—
Red Star Belgrade	1	—	2020	—
Vranje	1	—	2024	—
Novi Pazar	—	3	—	2019, 2020, 2021
Gromig Niš	—	2	—	2000, 2002
Smederevo	—	1	—	2026
Nova Pazova	—	1	—	2018
Euro Motus	—	1	—	2017
Deus Sremska Mitrovica	—	1	—	2016
Bečej	—	1	—	2015
Kopernikus Niš	—	1	—	2010
Liman Novi Sad	—	1	—	2008
Konjarnik Belgrade	—	1	—	2004
