= A.E.K. (sports club) =

Greek multi-sport club based in Athens

- Full name: Αθλητική Ένωσις Κωνσταντινουπόλεως; Athlitikí Énosis Konstantinoupόleos (Athletic Union of Constantinople)
- Nicknames: Vasílissa (Queen); Énosis (Union); Kitrinómavroi (The Yellow-Blacks); Dikéfalos Aetós (Two-Headed Eagle)
- Founded: 13 April 1924; 102 years ago
- Based in: Athens, Greece
- Colours: Yellow, Black
- Anthem: Empros tis AEK palikaria Lyricist: Christos Kolokotronis; Composer: Stelios Kazantzidis
- Chairman: Alexis Alexiou
- Club titles: Ιntercontinental Titles: 1 European Titles: 4 Balkan Titles: 1 Domestic Titles: 188
- Website: www.aek.gr

A.E.K. (Greek: AEK [ˈaek], formally Αθλητική Ένωσις Κωνσταντινουπόλεως; Athlitikí Énosis Konstantinoupόleos, Athletic Union of Constantinople) is the most successful and a major Greek multi-sport club, based in Nea Filadelfeia, Athens. The club is more commonly known in European competitions as A.E.K. Athens. The club's emblem is the double-headed eagle, the symbol of Palaiologos dynasty and the Byzantine Empire, their colours yellow and black, also inspired by the Byzantine Empire, serving to remind future generations of the glorious legacy of the Greeks of Constantinople.

Established in Athens on 13 April 1924, by Greek refugees from Constantinople, after the 1919–22 Greco-Turkish war, AEK maintains more than 30 sports departments (football, basketball, handball, volleyball, futsal, etc.), under the control of its amateur sports arm, Amateur AEK (Greek: Ερασιτεχνική ΑΕΚ; Erasitechnikί AEK), with noteworthy departments, such as its handball team, which is the best Greek handball club, in terms of European achievements, having won 1 EHF European Cup in 2021 and having also reached the final twice, in 2018 and in 2025 and the semi-finals in 2019, moreover, in 2021, it became the first Greek handball team to win the treble, while also marking the first treble in the sports club's history. Furthermore, its women's volleyball team, which has won several domestic titles and 1 Balkans title, the BVA Cup in 2025. At the same time, AEK have won numerous domestic titles across all of its sports departments, youth academies, as well as hundreds of first-place finishes in individual sports and have made notable participations in international competitions.

AEK are best known for its professional football team, which has made some notable appearances and wins in European competitions and have reached the semi-finals of the UEFA Europa League in 1977. AEK are the only Greek football club that have advanced to the quarter-finals of all European competitions (UEFA Champions League in 1969, UEFA Europa League in 1977, UEFA Cup Winners' Cup in 1997 and in 1998 and UEFA Conference League in 2026), having also won 14 Greek Championships, 16 Greek Cups, 1 Greek League Cup and 2 Greek Super Cups.

AEK are also known for its professional basketball team which has won 2 Saporta Cups, 1 Champions League, 1 FIBA Intercontinental Cup, 8 Greek Championships and 5 Greek Cups.

AEK are one of the most popular Greek clubs, and has a strong fanbase all over the world with well over 1 million supporters.

== History ==
=== 1924–1945 ===
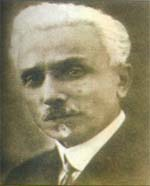
Konstantinos Spanoudis, first President of AEK

The large Greek population of Constantinople, not unlike those of the other Ottoman urban centres, continued its athletic traditions in the form of numerous athletic clubs. Clubs such as Énosis Tataoúlon (Ένωσις Ταταούλων) and Iraklís (today Kurtuluş S.K.) (Ηρακλής) from the Tatavla district, Mégas Aléxandros (Μέγας Αλέξανδρος) and Ermís (Ερμής) of Galata, and Olympiás (Ολυμπιάς) of Therapia existed to promote the Hellenic athletic and cultural ideals. These were amongst a dozen Greek-backed clubs that dominated the sporting landscape of the city in the years preceding World War I. After the war, with the influx of mainly French and British soldiers to Constantinople, many of the city clubs participated in regular competition with teams formed by the foreign troops. Taxim, Pera, and Tatavla became the scene of weekly competitions in football, athletics, cycling, boxing and tennis.

Ermís, one of the most popular clubs, was formed in 1875 by the Greek community of the city.

Another club of Pera (Galata), known as Pera, since the mid-1880s, forced to change its name to Pera Sports Club, and then Beyoğlu S.K., in 1923. Many of its athletes, with those of the other sporting clubs, fled during the population exchanges at the end of the Greco-Turkish War, and settled mainly in Athens and Thessaloniki.

In 1924, the founders of AEK - a group of Constantinopolitan refugees (among them many athletes from the Pera Sports Club and the other Constantinopolitan clubs) - met at the athletic shop "Lux" of Emilios Ionas and Konstantinos Dimopoulos on Veranzerou Street, in the center of Athens, and created AEK. Their intention was to create a club that provided athletic and cultural diversions for the thousands of predominantly Constantinopolitan and Anatolian refugees who had settled in the new suburbs of Athens (including Nea Filadelfeia, Nea Ionia, Nea Chalkidona, Nea Smyrni).

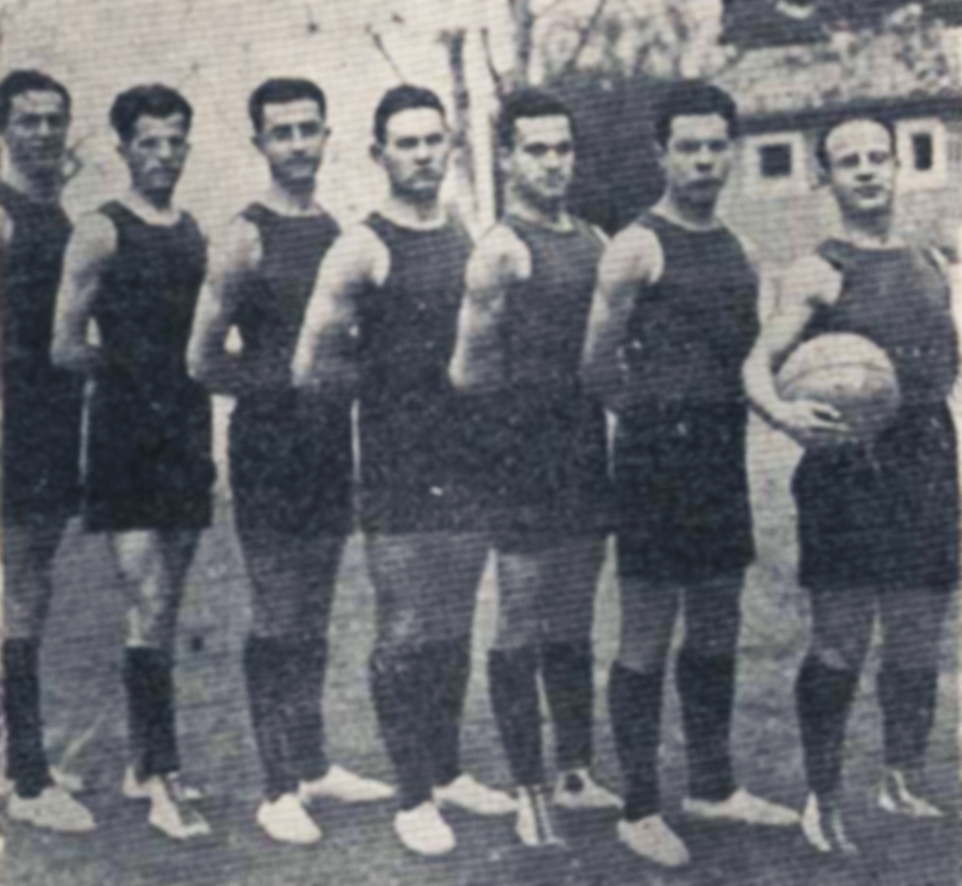
Basketball team (1928)

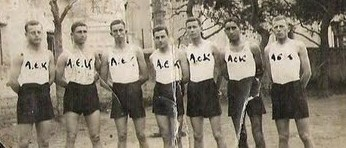
Volleyball team (1932)

AEK's first president, Konstantinos Spanoudis (1871–1941), a journalist and associate of the Prime Minister Eleftherios Venizelos, petitioned the government to set aside land for the establishment of a sports ground. In 1926, land in Nea Filadelfeia that was originally set aside for refugee housing, was donated as a training ground for the refugees' sports activities. AEK began using the ground for training, albeit unofficially.

In 1930, the property where AEK trained was officially signed over to the club. Venizelos soon approved the plans to build what was to become AEK's home ground for the next 70 years, the Nikos Goumas Stadium. The liberal politician was present at the inauguration of the stadium.

AEK Athletic Club was established in 1924 and is one of the most successful departments of AEK. One of the first sections of the AEK athletic club was cycling. M. Kaloudis was a winner in the Balkan Games (in 1940 in Bucharest when he was third) and was one of the founders of the Chamber. He first appeared in 1929 and was followed by Petoun, Tarsinian and Krisalis. Another cycling ace was Kouvelis, who won the gold medal in the Balkan Games of 1940 in the race of 33 kilometers. Both Kaloudis and his Kouvelis participated in the Olympic Games in London in 1948.

=== 1945–1960 ===
In the Olympic Games of 1948 in London, M. Kaloudis led to the new excursion of AEK in cycling. At the beginning of the 1950s, the sport had blossomed and AEK competed with Panionios and Panathinaikos. The department then had a plethora of skilled cyclists as Davouti, Kouyioumtzis (won the race Athens-Loutraki 1952), Chatziargyri, Georgiadis, Arapi, Barda, Alexis, Tzioti, Barla, Trasian, etc.

AEK Table Tennis Club acquired the third position, both in men and in young men championships, in Greece in 1959. AEK Athens Table Tennis (ping-pong) Club, participated in Greek championships during the decades of 1950s, 1960s, 1970s and 1980s.

=== 1961–1970 ===
AEK was the first ever Greek basketball team to participate in the FIBA European Champions Cup (now called the EuroLeague) Final Four, in 1966, which was held in Bologna, Italy. Two years later, AEK was the first-ever Greek team, not only to reach a FIBA European Cup Winners' Cup Final, but also to win a European-wide title. On April 4, 1968, AEK captained by Giorgos Amerikanos, defeated Slavia VŠ Praha, by a score of 89–82, in Athens, in front of 80,000 spectators (at the time, the Guinness world record in basketball attendance) in Kallimarmaron Stadium.

AEK Athens V.C. is the volleyball team of the Greek sports club AEK. It was re-founded in 1967 by Jason Platsi. Over the years AEK have struggled to stay in the top flight of Greek volleyball, competing in A2 (Greece's second division) and A1.

The Boxing Club was founded in 1969 and during the 1970s had its first success.

=== 1971–1980 ===
The football team, with star player the striker Thomas Mavros, reached the semi-finals of UEFA Cup in 1977, where they were eliminated by Juventus. The Italian team eventually won the trophy.

With many star players they continued appearing in European (UEFA Champions League and UEFA Cup) competitions.

=== 1981–1990 ===
AEK Table Tennis Club acquired the third position in Greek Cups of 1984 and 1985. The relevant department of AEK was inactive for almost 23 years (1986–2009).

=== 1991–2000 ===
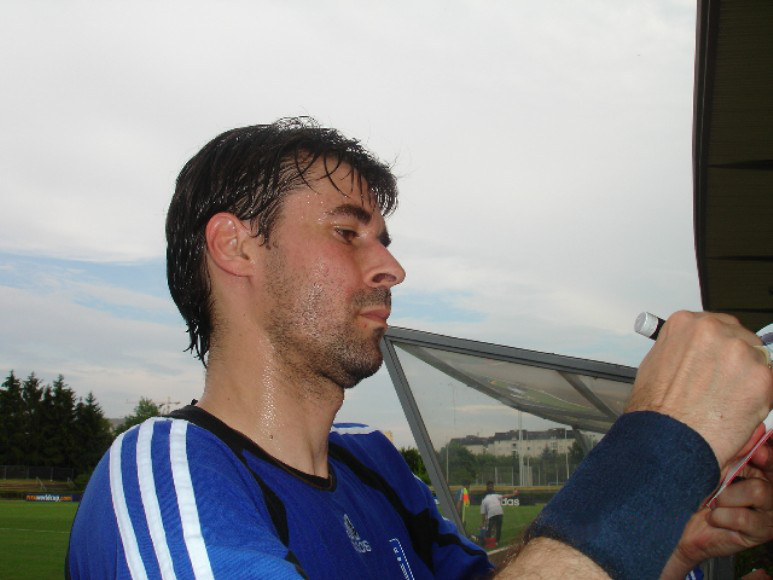
Vasilios Tsiartas

The football team, under the guidance of ex-player Dušan Bajević won three consecutive championships in 1992, 1993 and 1994.

Since 1995, AEK also has a women's volley club team, which has advanced to the final of the Greek Cup (2011).

The department of fencing was founded in 1996.

The basketball team reached the FIBA EuroLeague's Final Four in Barcelona in 1998, and beat Benetton Treviso, by a score of 69–66, before losing in the EuroLeague Final to Kinder Bologna, by a score of 44–58. In 2000, on 11 April, AEK won their second international trophy, the FIBA Saporta Cup, by defeating Kinder Bologna 83–76.

The biggest success for the boxing department came in the late 1990s, with Tigran Ouzlian, Artur Mikaelyan and Mike Arnaoutis (who became a professional boxer in the United States).

=== 2001–2010 ===
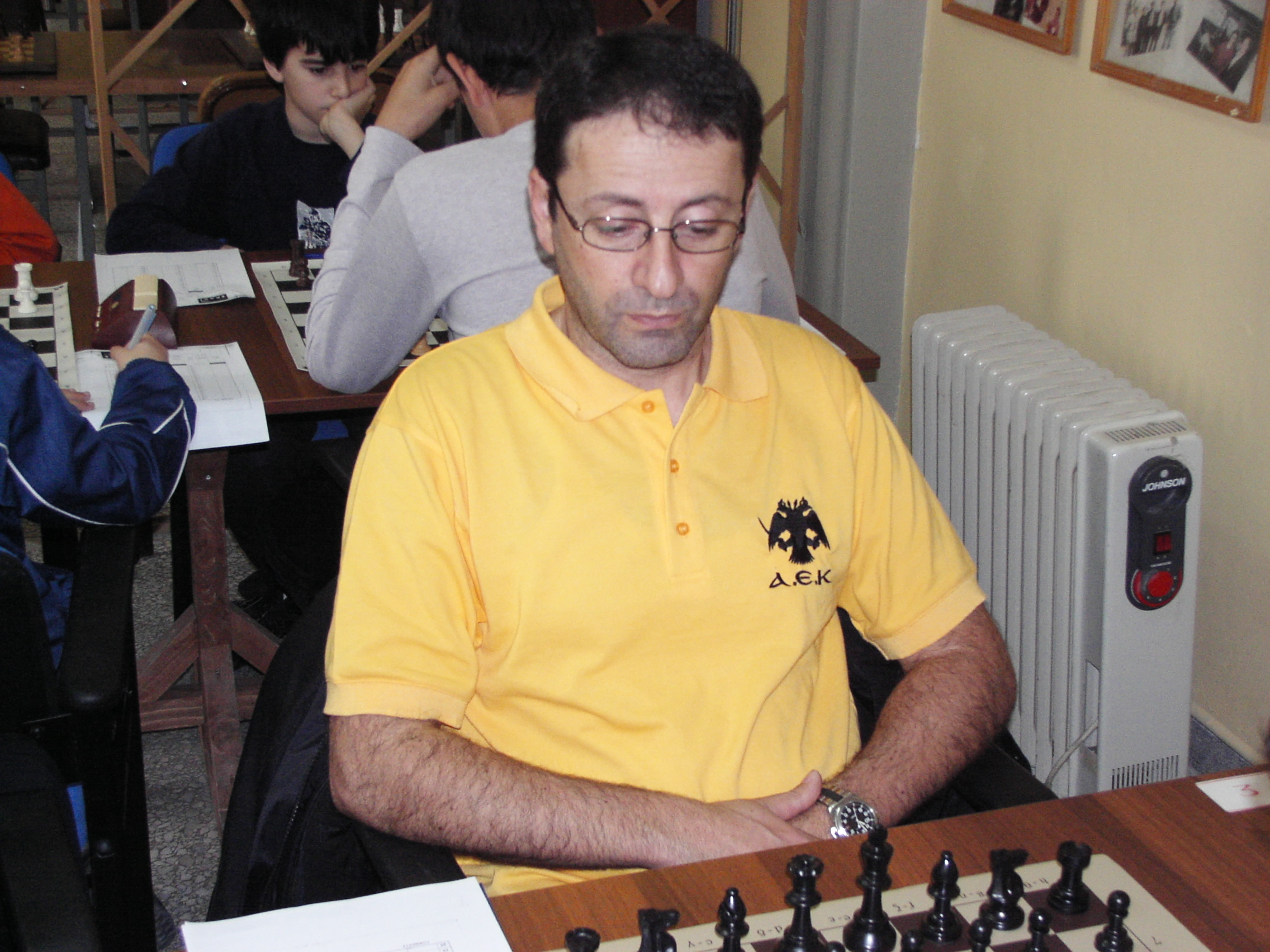
AEK chess club (2008)

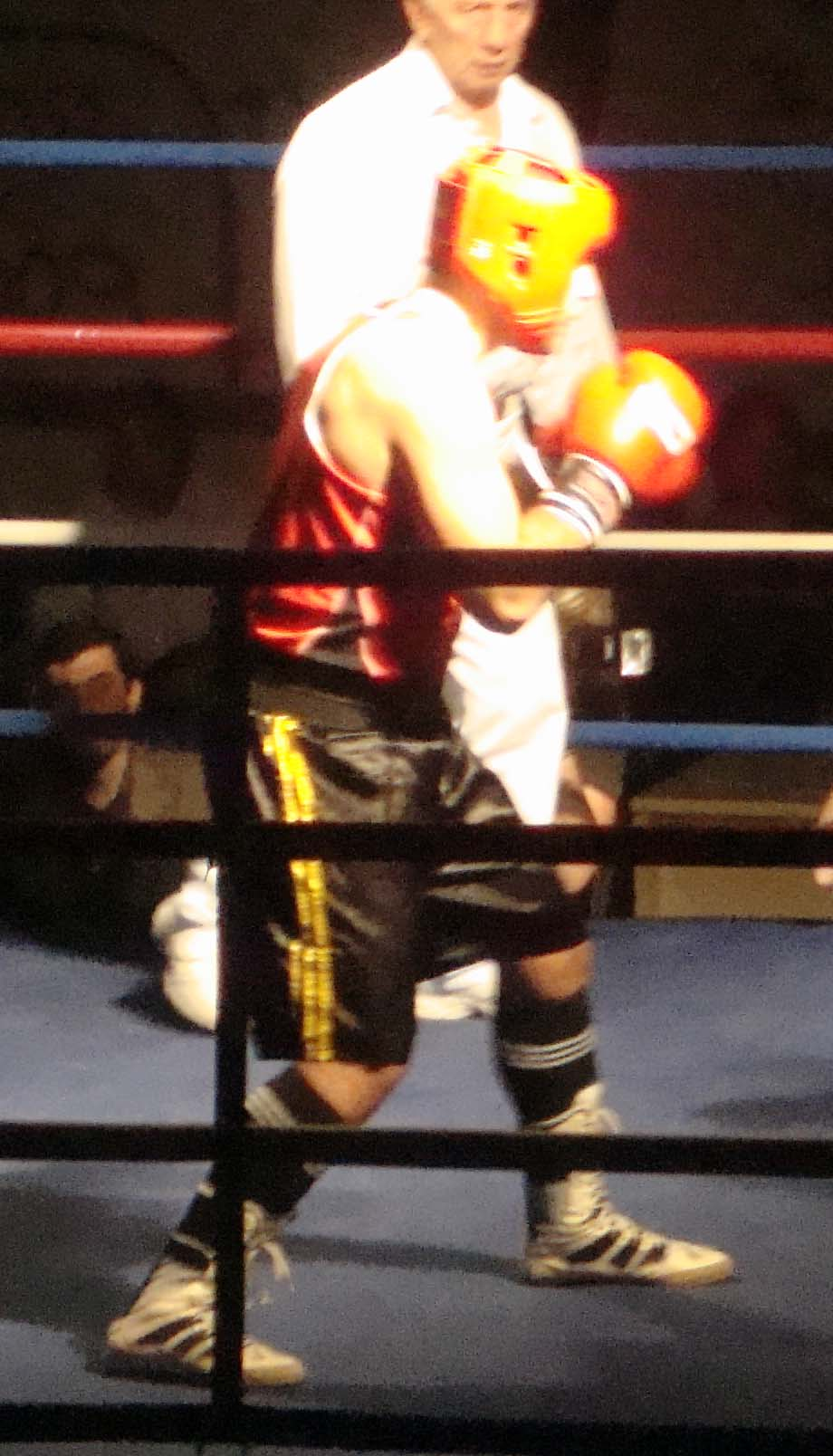
AEK boxing

AEK H.C. is also another growing department of AEK. It was founded by a decision of the General Assembly of AEK on July 12, 2005. On August 5, 2005, the Greek Handball Federation accepted a merger of GA Ilioupolis with the Handball Sports Union of Constantinople. In 2007 AEK HC was 3rd in A1 and gained the first participation in European Cups. On 31 May 2009, AEK HC won the Greek Cup in Serres.

The department of AEK Futsal Club was established in 2008 by a merger with Enosi Geraka futsal team and participated in B'Ethniki (second division), where it finished first at the regular season and second after play-off games. However, for the period 2009–10 AEK futsal club is playing again at B'Ethniki, due to a decision taken by EPO (Greek Football Federation), forbidding all team mergers generally. AEK Futsal Club terminated at second position of B'Ethniki after play-off games in April 2010 and gained the participation in A'Ethniki (first division) for the period 2010–11 and has been advanced to the semi-finals of the Greek Cup (2011).

The Chess department was founded by a decision of the General Assembly of AEK on 12 July 2005. The department staffed directly by 3 September 2005 is a member of the Greek Chess Federation. In 2006 AEK Chess Club was Greek Cup finalist and in 2008 Greek Cup semi-finalist (third place). Also won the Attica Cup in 2006 and the Attica Rapid Championships in 2006, 2009 and 2010. In 2010 participated at A' Ethniki (1st Division) and took the seventh place.

AEK VC had its finest moment with coach Stelios Prosalikas, as has prevailed in the final four of the European Cup Winners Cup. The races held (9–10 March 2000) in the closed Nea Liosia and AEK lost in the semi-final by Cuneo, but won 3–1 Galatasaray in the small final and won the third place.

=== 2011–2023 ===
In 2011, AEK FC won the Greek Cup.

In 2011, AEK HC won the Greek Championship.

Also, on 26 February 2011, AEK HC advanced to the quarter-final (best 8) of European Challenge Cup by defeating Sporting Lisboa.

In 2012, AEK WVC won the Greek Women Championship.

In 2013, AEK HC make Double won the Greek Championship and the Greek Cup.

In 2014, AEK HC won the Greek Cup.

In 2014, AEK VC won the Greek Men's League Cup.

In 2016, AEK FC won the Greek Cup.

In 2018, AEK BC won the FIBA Champions League and the Greek Cup.

In 2018, AEK FC won the Super League Greece.

In 2018, AEK Futsal won the Greek Cup.

Also, in 2018, AEK HC reached the final of Challenge Cup.

In 2019, AEK BC won the FIBA Intercontinental Cup to complete a historic intercontinental treble.

In 2019, AEK Futsal won the Greek Championship.

In 2019, AEK Women's Futsal won the Hellenic Futsal Greek Championship.

In 2020, AEK BC won the Greek Cup.

In 2020 AEK Futsal won the Greek Championship.

In 2020, AEK HC won the Greek Championship.

In 2021, AEK HC won the Greek Championship, the Greek Cup and the EHF European Cup, a historic European treble.

In 2023, AEK Futsal Women's department won a national treble after winning the Hellenic Futsal Championship, Cup, and Super Cup.

== Crest and colours ==
Since the club's foundation AEK adopted the image of a double-headed eagle on a golden yellow background. The emblem and colours were chosen as a reminder for the lost homelands and they represent the club's historical ties to Constantinople. Its usage also survived as a decorative element in the Greek Orthodox Church, which was the inheritor of the Byzantine legacy during the Ottoman Empire, while it remained a popular symbol among Greeks. In modern Greece various variations of the two-headed eagles are used in Church flags (based on Byzantine flag patterns and heraldic emblems) and officially by the Hellenic Army; the bird found also its way into the Greek coat of arms for a brief period in 1925–1926.

== Sport departments ==
AEK is an amateur multi-sports club with the mission to create and advance as many sports as it is possible and its main professional and semiprofessional teams operate independently.

The club has teams in many sports, including athletics, cycling, boxing, chess, fencing, table tennis, wrestling, weightlifting, gymnastics, swimming, water polo both male and female teams, rugby league, tennis, badminton, kickboxing, taekwondo, Brazilian jiu-jitsu, wheelchair basketball, and esports, but its most popular teams primarily compete in association football, basketball, volleyball, handball, and futsal.

== Top-flight titles by department ==
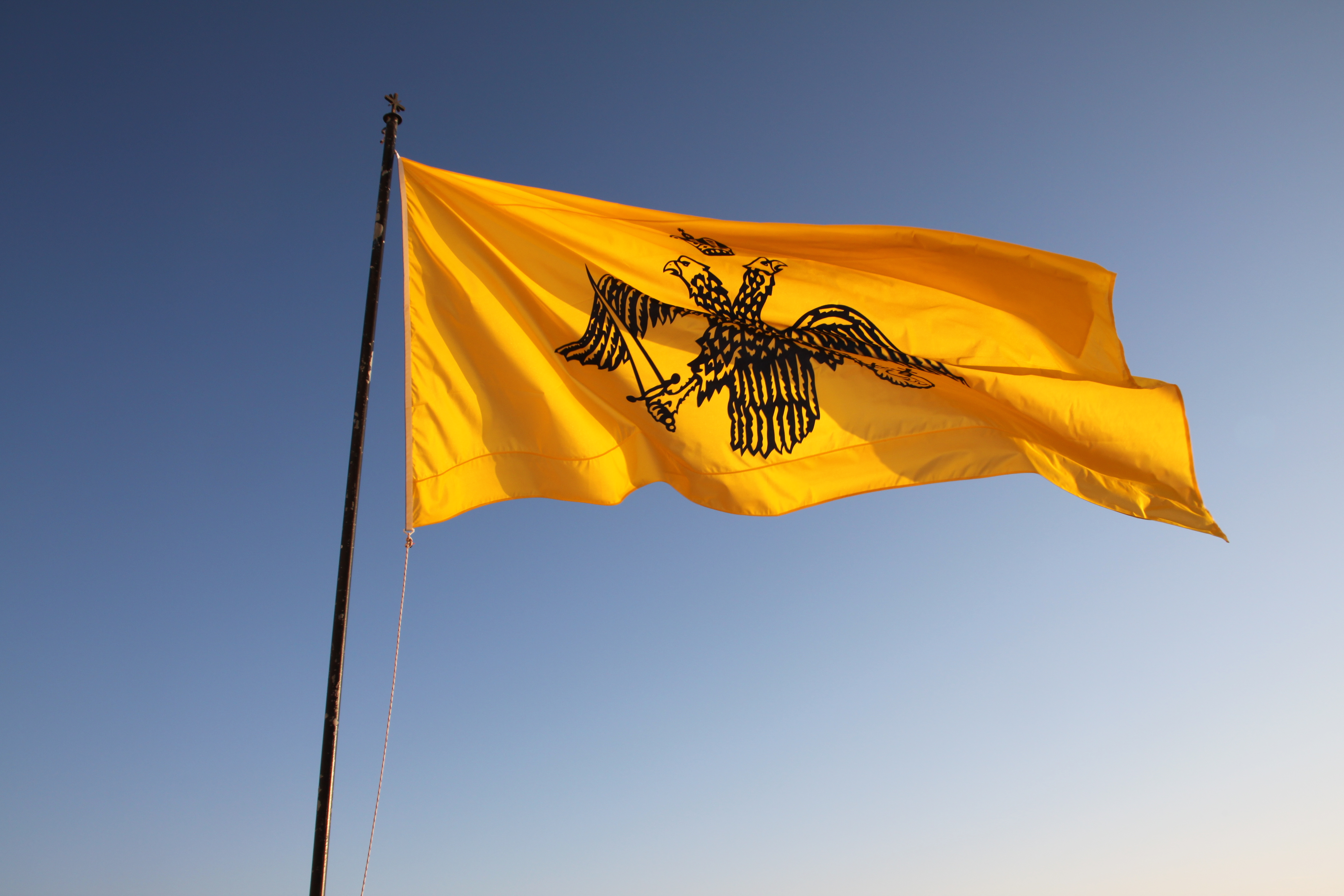
Greek Orthodox Church flag

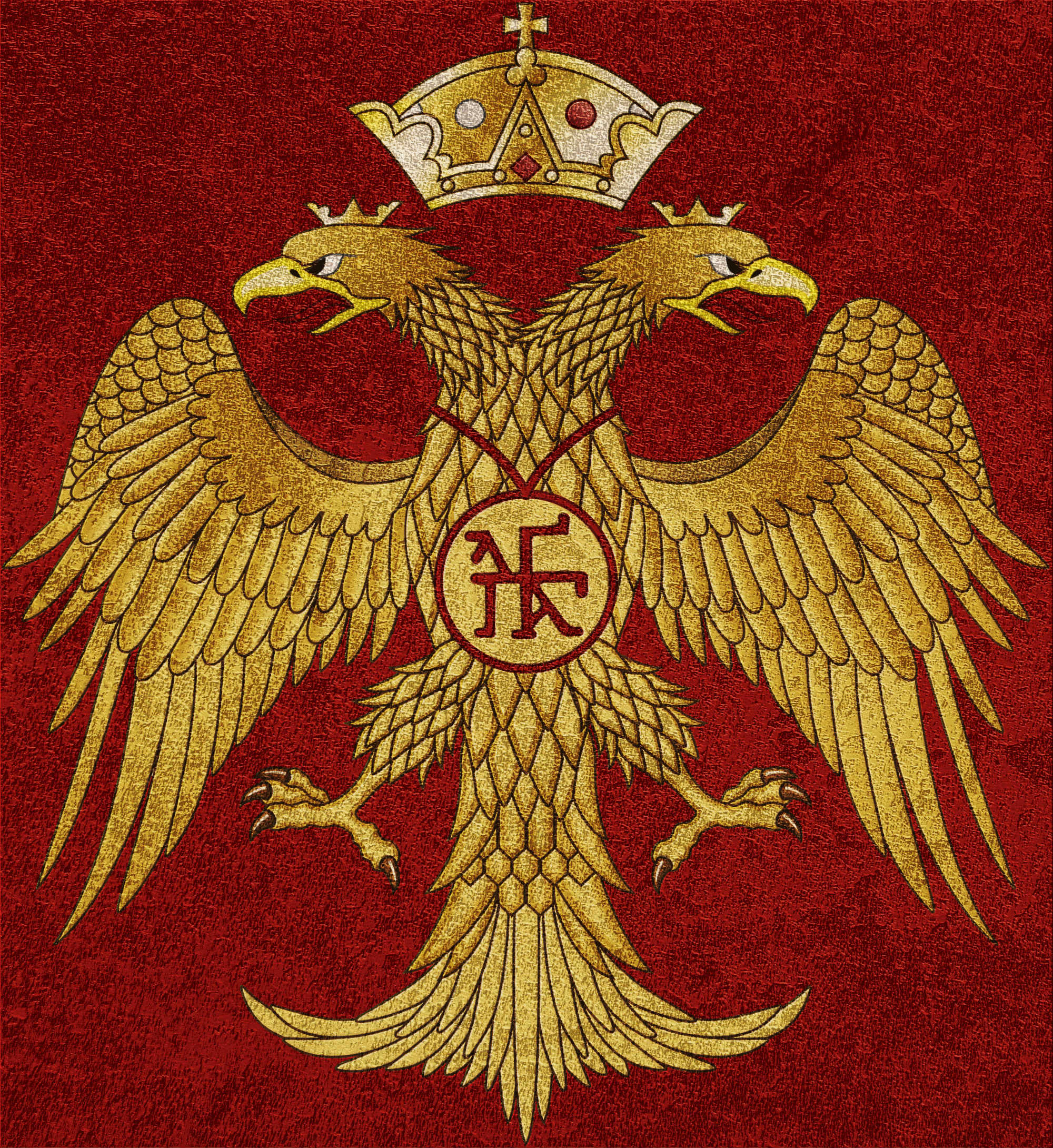
Emblem of the Palaiologos dynasty and the Byzantine Empire

=== A.E.K. Football Club Men (33) ===
- Greek Championships (14): 1939, 1940, 1963, 1968, 1971, 1978, 1979, 1989, 1992, 1993, 1994, 2018, 2023, 2026
- Greek Cup (16): 1932, 1939, 1949, 1950, 1956, 1964, 1966, 1978, 1983, 1996, 1997, 2000, 2002, 2011, 2016, 2023
- Greek League Cup (1): 1990 (record)
- Greek Super Cup (2): 1989, 1996

=== A.E.K. Football Club Women (2) ===
- Greek Championship (1): 2025
- Greek Cup (1): 2025

=== A.E.K. Basketball Club (17) ===
- Intercontinental Cup (1): 2019
- European Cup Winners' Cup / Saporta Cup (2): 1968, 2000
- Champions League (1): 2018
- Greek Championships (8): 1958, 1963, 1964, 1965, 1966, 1968, 1970, 2002
- Greek Basketball Cup (5): 1981, 2000, 2001, 2018, 2020

=== A.E.K. Handball Club Men (11) ===
- EHF European Cup (1): 2021
- Greek Championship (5): 2011, 2013, 2020, 2021, 2023
- Greek Cup (5): 2009, 2013, 2014, 2021, 2025

=== A.E.K. Volleyball Club Men (1) ===
- Greek League Cup (1): 2014

=== A.E.K. Volleyball Club Women (4) ===
- Greek Championship (1): 2012
- Greek Cup (1): 2023
- Greek Super Cup (1): 2012
- BVA Cup (1): 2025

=== A.E.K. Rugby League (6) ===
- Greek Championship 9's (3): 2018, 2019, 2026
- Greek Championship 13's (2): 2018, 2019
- Greek Rugby League Federation Championship (1): 2023

=== A.E.K. Futsal Men (11) ===
- Greek Championship (4): 2019, 2020, 2024, 2025
- Greek Cup (2): 2018, 2023
- Greek Super Cup (5): 2018, 2019, 2023, 2024, 2025 (record)

=== A.E.K. Futsal Women (11) ===
- Hellenic Futsal Super League (5): 2019, 2023, 2024, 2025, 2026 (record)
- Hellenic Futsal Greek Cup (4): 2022, 2023, 2025, 2026 (record)
- Hellenic Futsal Greek Super Cup (2): 2022, 2024 (record)

=== A.E.K. Cycling (38) ===
- Greek Championship (Overall Standings) (10): 1960, 1961, 1962, 1964, 1965, 1966, 1968, 1975, 1979, 1981
- Greek Road Cycling Championship (12): 1960, 1961, 1964, 1966, 1968, 1974, 1975, 1976, 1977, 1979, 1980, 1981
- Greek Men Track Championship (6): 1960, 1961, 1962, 1964, 1965, 1966
- Greek Team Trial Championship (5): 1968, 1974, 1975, 1976, 1979
- Greek Men Pursuit Championship (5): 1961, 1962, 1964, 1966, 1967

=== A.E.K. Boxing (6) ===
- Greek Men Championship (6): 1978, 1980, 1995, 1999, 2000, 2006

=== A.E.K. Athletics (22) ===
- Greek Men Cross-Country Championships (10): 1937, 1946, 1957, 1958, 1959, 1960, 1961, 1962, 1963, 1964
- Greek Women Championship (4): 2011, 2012, 2013, 2014
- Greek Women Indoor Championship (3): 2011, 2015, 2016
- Greek Women Cross-Country Championship (5): 2010, 2011, 2012, 2025, 2026

=== A.E.K. Fencing (12) ===
- Greek Women Championship (10): 2012, 2013, 2014, 2015, 2016, 2017, 2018, 2019, 2020, 2021
- Greek Men Championship (2): 2018, 2020

=== A.E.K. Table Tennis (2) ===
- Greek Men Championship (2): 2019, 2020

=== A.E.K. Artistic Swimming (1) ===
- Greek Championship OPEN (1): 2022

=== A.E.K. Bowling (3) ===
- Greek Championship (3): 2022, 2023, 2025

=== A.E.K. eSports (7) ===
- Championship VGL Greece-Cyprus FIFA 11vs11 (1): Season 2 2019-20
- Championship Superliga GR FIFA 11vs11 VGL (1): 2021
- Championship Greek League HFP 11vs11 (1): Season 4 2022
- Greek E-Cup FIFA (4):2023, 2024, 2025, 2026

=== A.E.K. Weightlifting (1) ===
- Greek Powerlifting Championship (1): 2017

== European and worldwide honours ==
=== Medals by competition and club department ===
==== Men's Football ====
| Competition | Gold | Silver | Bronze | Total |
| FIFA Intercontinental Cup | 0 | 0 | 0 | 0 |
| FIFA Club World Cup/FIFA Club World Championship | 0 | 0 | 0 | 0 |
| UEFA Super Cup/Super Competition | 0 | 0 | 0 | 0 |
| UEFA Champions League/European Champion Clubs' Cup | 0 | 0 | 0 | 0 |
| UEFA Europa League/UEFA Cup | 0 | 0 | 1 | 1 |
| UEFA Cup Winners' Cup/European Cup Winners' Cup | 0 | 0 | 0 | 0 |
| UEFA Conference League | 0 | 0 | 0 | 0 |
| Balkans Cup | 0 | 1 | 0 | 1 |
| Total | 0 | 1 | 1 | 2 |

==== Men's Basketball ====
| Competition | Gold | Silver | Bronze | Total |
| FIBA Intercontinental Cup/FIBA Club World Cup | 1 | 0 | 0 | 1 |
| Euroleague/FIBA European Champions Cup | 0 | 1 | 1 | 2 |
| FIBA Basketball Champions League | 1 | 2 | 1 | 4 |
| FIBA Saporta Cup/FIBA European Cup Winners Cup | 2 | 0 | 1 | 3 |
| EuroCup/ULEB Cup | 0 | 0 | 0 | 0 |
| FIBA EuroChallenge/FIBA EuroCup | 0 | 0 | 0 | 0 |
| FIBA Korać Cup | 0 | 0 | 0 | 0 |
| Total | 4 | 3 | 3 | 10 |

==== Men's Volleyball ====
| Competition | Gold | Silver | Bronze | Total |
| CEV Champions League/CEV European Champions Cup | 0 | 0 | 0 | 0 |
| CEV Cup/CEV Cup Winners' Cup | 0 | 0 | 1 | 1 |
| CEV Challenge Cup/CEV Cup | 0 | 0 | 0 | 0 |
| Total | 0 | 0 | 1 | 1 |

==== Women's Volleyball ====
| Competition | Gold | Silver | Bronze | Total |
| BVA Cup | 1 | 0 | 0 | 1 |
| Total | 1 | 0 | 0 | 1 |

==== Men's Handball ====
| Competition | Gold | Silver | Bronze | Total |
| EHF Champions League | 0 | 0 | 0 | 0 |
| EHF European League/EHF Cup | 0 | 0 | 0 | 0 |
| EHF European Cup/EHF Challenge Cup | 1 | 2 | 1 | 4 |
| Total | 1 | 2 | 1 | 4 |

=== Medals by year of achievement ===
| Season | Men's Football | Men's Basketball | Men's Handball | Men's Volleyball | Women's Volleyball |
|---|---|---|---|---|---|
| 1965–66 | | EuroLeague 4th | | | |
| 1966–67 | Balkans Cup Runners-up | | | | |
| 1967–68 | | Cup Winners' Cup Winners | | | |
| 1969–70 | | Cup Winners' Cup Semi-finals | | | |
| 1976–77 | UEFA Cup Semi-finals | | | | |
| 1997–98 | | EuroLeague Runners-up | | | |
| 1999–00 | | Saporta Cup Winners | | CEV Cup Winners' Cup 3rd | |
| 2000–01 | | EuroLeague Semi-finals | | | |
| 2017–18 | | Champions League Winners | EHF Challenge Cup Runners-up | | |
| 2018–19 | | Intercontinental Cup Champions | EHF Challenge Cup Semi-finals | | |
| 2019–20 | | Champions League Runners-up | | | |
| 2020–21 | | | EHF European Cup Winners | | |
| 2024–25 | | Champions League 3rd | | | |
| 2024–25 | | | EHF European Cup Runners-up | | |
| 2025 | | | | | BVA Cup Winners |
| 2025–26 | | Champions League Runners-up | | | |

== Notable supporters ==
- Nikos Angelidis, journalist, politician
- Giannis Aivazis, actor, handball player
- Alekos Alavanos, politician
- Antonis Antoniou, actor
- Milena Apostolaki, politician
- Evangelia Aravani, model
- Eleftheria Arvanitaki, singer
- Orfeas Avgoustidis, actor
- Vasilis Avlonitis, actor
- Bartholomew I of Constantinople, is the 270th and current Archbishop of Constantinople and Ecumenical Patriarch
- Maria Bakodimou, TV presenter
- Niki Bakoyianni, high jumper, Olympian
- Sotiria Bellou, rebetiko singer
- Nikos Beloyannis, resistance leader
- Kostas Bigalis, singer
- Alexandros Bourdoumis, actor
- Max Cavalera, musician
- Christodoulos of Athens, Archbishop of Athens and All Greece
- Nives Celsius, model
- Rallia Christidou, singer, politician
- Phoebus Delivorias, singer, songwriter
- Lavrentis Dianellos, actor
- Nader Dahabi, 37th Prime Minister of Jordan
- Fokion Dimitriadis (Fokos), caricaturist
- Nikos Dimou, writer
- Natalia Dragoumi, actress
- Antigoni Drisbioti, race walker, Olympian
- Yannis Economides, filmmaker
- Chronis Exarhakos, actor
- Nikos Georgantzoglou, businessman, tv-producer, politician
- Tasos Giannopoulos, actor
- Manolis Glezos, politician
- Kostas Hatzichristos, actor
- Meletis Ilias, actor
- Nasos Iliopoulos, SYRIZA's Press representative
- Antonis Kafetzopoulos, actor
- Antonis Kalogiannis, singer
- Manos Katrakis, actor
- Michalis Kaltezas, victim of police's abuse of authority
- Stelios Kazantzidis, singer
- Panos Kammenos, politician
- Chrysa Katsarini, stand-up comedian
- Tzortzia Kefala, singer (BLE), politician
- Panos Kiamos, singer
- Giorgos Konitopoulos, musician
- Lambros Konstantaras, actor
- Pavlos Kontogiannidis, actor
- Fotis Kouvelis, former leader of Democratic Left
- Stamatis Kraounakis, composer
- Stelios Kritikos, actor, storyteller
- Vasilis Logothetidis, actor
- Stelios Mainas, actor
- Pavlos Mamalos, powerlifter, Paralympic Gold medalist
- Giorgos Margaritis, singer
- Yannis Maris, detective fiction writer
- Notis Mavroudis, composer
- Michalis Menidiatis, singer
- Dimitris Melissanidis, businessman
- Fotis Metaxopoulos, dancer, choreographer
- Giorgos Mitsakis, musician
- Giorgos Mitsikostas, comedian, actor
- Sotiris Moustakas, actor
- Katerina Moutsatsou, actress
- Dimitris Myrat, actor
- Lina Nikolakopoulou, lyricist
- Nikos Nikolaou, actor
- Christos Nikolopoulos, composer, musician
- Kostas Nikouli, actor
- Aristotle Onasis, one of the world's richest men
- Nikos Orfanos, actor, politician
- Pavlos Orkopoulos, actor
- Spyros Ornerakis, caricaturist
- Tzimis Panousis, musician
- Pantelis Pantelidis, songwriter and singer
- James Pantemis, football player
- Miltos Paschalidis, singer, songwriter
- Errika Prezerakou, pole vaulter
- Alexandros Pantelias, musician (Kitrina Podilata)
- Giorgos Pantelias, musician (Kitrina Podilata)
- Makis Papadimitriou, actor
- Antonis Papadopoulos, actor
- Christos Papadopoulos, musician, composer
- Lefteris Papadopoulos, lyricist
- Giannis Papaioannou, musician, composer
- Giannis Papathanasis, actor
- Ange Postecoglou, football manager
- Stathis Psaltis, actor
- Psarantonis, musician
- Stelios Perpiniadis, rebetiko musician
- Miltiadis Papaioannou, politician
- Thanasis Polykandriotis, musician, composer
- Evanthia Reboutsika, musician, composer
- Zozo Sapountzaki, actress, singer
- Marina Satti, singer
- Nikos Sergianopoulos, actor
- Stan, singer
- Spiros Skouras, film producer
- Pandelis Thalassinos, musician
- Kostas Terzakis, actor, voice actor
- Gianna Terzi, singer
- Marios Tokas, composer
- Sakis Tolis, singer (Rotting Christ)
- Makis Triantafyllopoulos, Greek journalist
- Kostas Tsakonas, actor
- Aris Tsapis, actor
- Paschalis Tsarouchas, actor
- Stefanos Tsitsipas, tennis player, Olympian
- Yannis Tsortsekis, actor
- TUS, rapper
- Giorgos Vasiliou, actor
- Elias Venezis, novelist
- Anna Verouli, javelin thrower, Olympian
- Anestis Vlahos, actor
- Pantelis Voulgaris, film director
- Giannis Vouros, actor, politician
- Kostas Voutsas, actor
- Despoina Vandi, singer
- Eleni Vitali, singer
- Nikos Xanthopoulos, actor
- Stavros Xenidis, actor
- Nikos Xilouris, singer
- Thomas Zabras, stand-up comedian
- Zannino, actor
- Christoforos Zaralikos, stand-up comedian, actor
- Peggy Zina, singer
- Efthimis Zisakis, actor

== Presidential history ==
| Period | Name |
|---|---|
| 1924–1933 | (Greece) Konstantinos Spanoudis |
| 1933–1936 | (Greece) Konstantinos Konstantaras |
| 1936–1937 | (Greece) Konstantinos Zarifis |
| 1937–1939 | (Greece) Konstantinos Theofanidis |
| 1939–1940 | (Greece) Konstantinos Chrysopoulos |
| 1940 | (Greece) Ioannis Chrysafidis |
| 1940–1943 | — |
| 1943–1946 | (Greece) Emilios Ionas |
| 1946–1948 | (Greece) Spyridon Skouras |
| 1948–1953 | (Greece) Georgios Melas |
| 1953–1954 | (Greece) Eleftherios Venizelos |
| 1954–1957 | (Greece) Georgios Chrysafidis |
| 1957–1963 | (Greece) Nikos Goumas |
| 1963–1965 | (Greece) Alexandros Makridis |
| 1965–1966 | (Greece) Georgios Toubalidis |
| 1966–1967 | (Greece) Michail Trikoglou |
| 1967 | (Greece) Emmanouil Kalitsounakis |
| 1967–1969 | (Greece) Kosmas Kyriakidis |
| 1969–1970 | (Greece) Georgios Chrysafidis |
| 1970–1973 | (Greece) Kosmas Chatzicharalampous |
| 1973 | (Greece) Dimitrios Avramidis |

| Period | Name |
|---|---|
| 1973–1974 | (Greece) Ioannis Theodorakopoulos |
| 1974–1979 | (Greece) Loukas Barlos |
| 1979–1986 | (Greece) Kosmas Chatzicharalampous |
| 1986–1987 | (Greece) Dimitris Rousakis |
| 1987–1988 | (Greece) Takis Dimitrakopoulos |
| 1988–1989 | (Greece) Makis Psomiadis |
| 1989–1990 | (Greece) Takis Dimitrakopoulos |
| 1990–1991 | (Greece) Dimitris Rousakis |
| 1991–1993 | (Greece) Kostas Voutsopoulos |
| 1993–1994 | (Greece) Athina Lefaki |
| 1994 | (Greece) Charalampos Dimitrelos |
| 1994–1996 | (Greece) Michalis Lefakis |
| 1996–2005 | (Greece) Giannis Granitsas |
| 2005–2006 | (Greece) Achilleas Kourepis |
| 2006–2008 | (Greece) Andreas Anatoliotakis |
| 2008–2011 | (Greece) Dimitris Chatzichristos |
| 2011–2012 | (Greece) Nikos Georgantzoglou |
| 2012–2013 | (Greece) Kostas Papadimitriou |
| 2013–2014 | (Greece) Konstantinos Kotsatos |
| 2014–2026 | (Greece) Alexis Alexiou |

== Gallery ==
Football

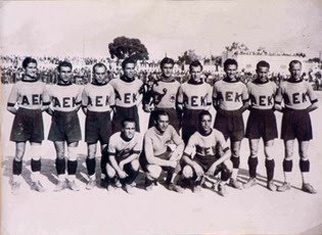
ΑΕΚ in 1925

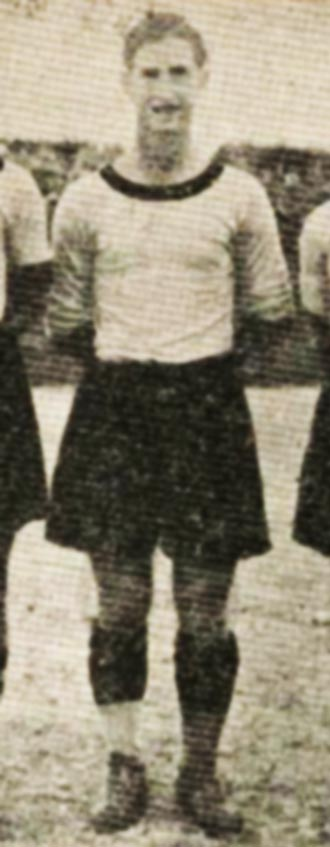
Kleanthis Maropoulos

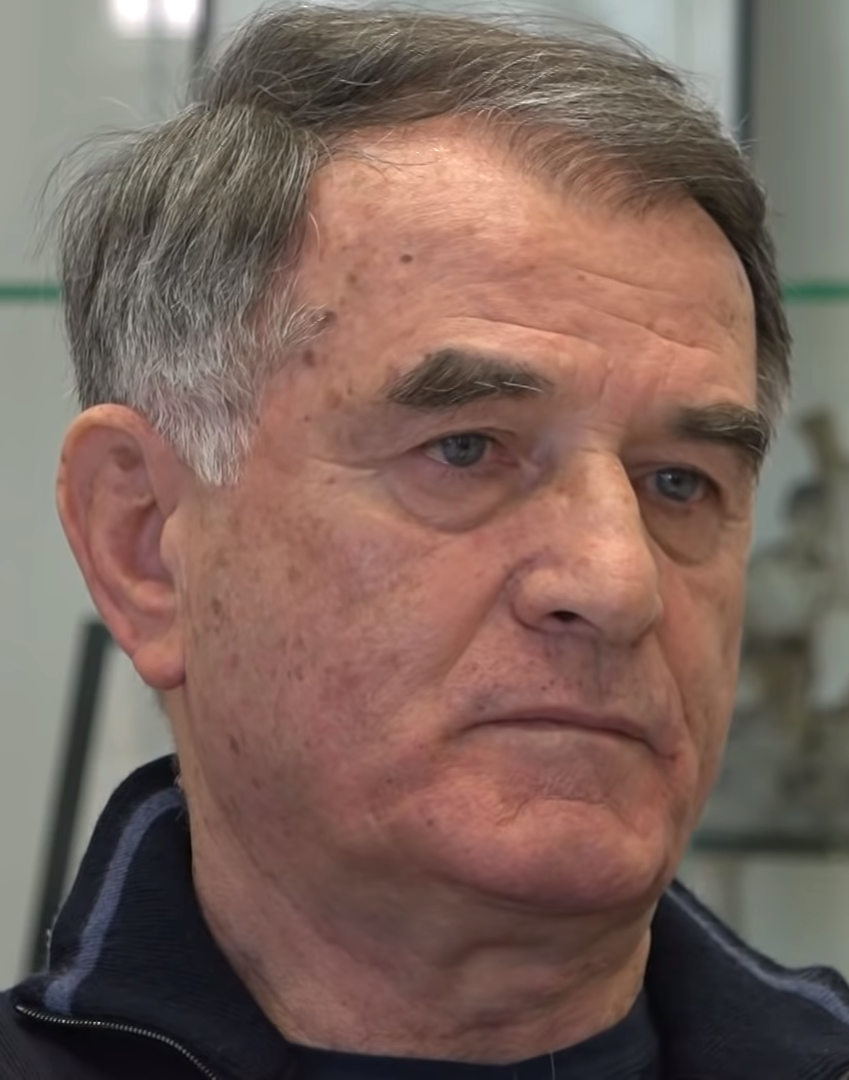
Dušan Bajević

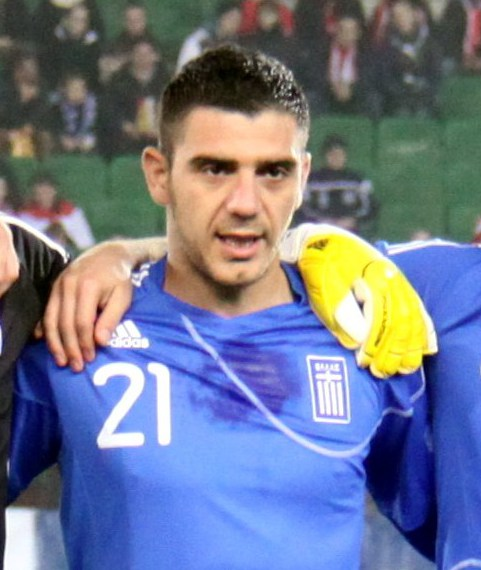
Kostas Katsouranis

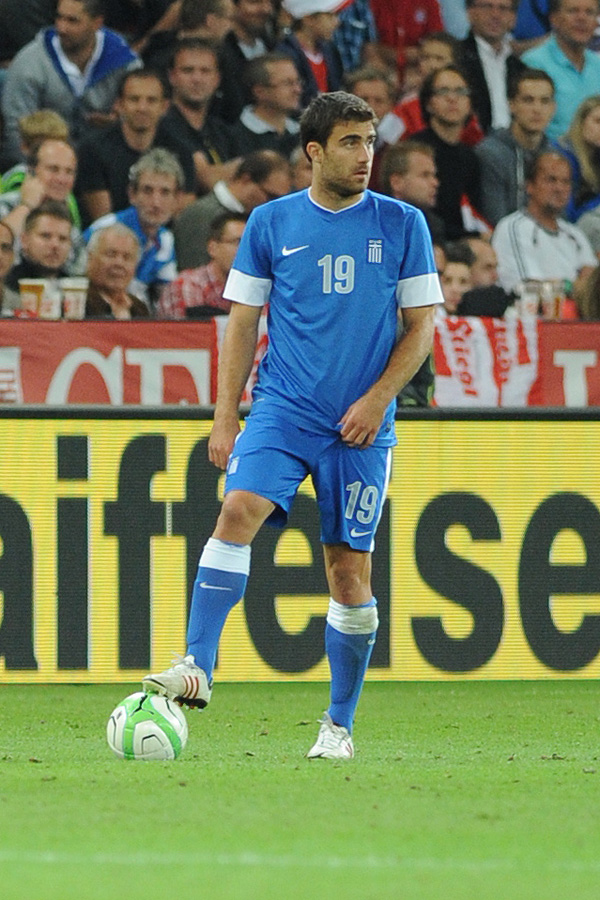
Sokratis Papastathopoulos

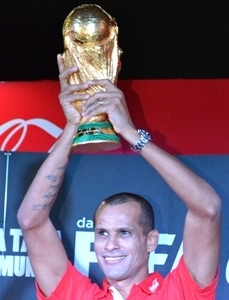
Rivaldo

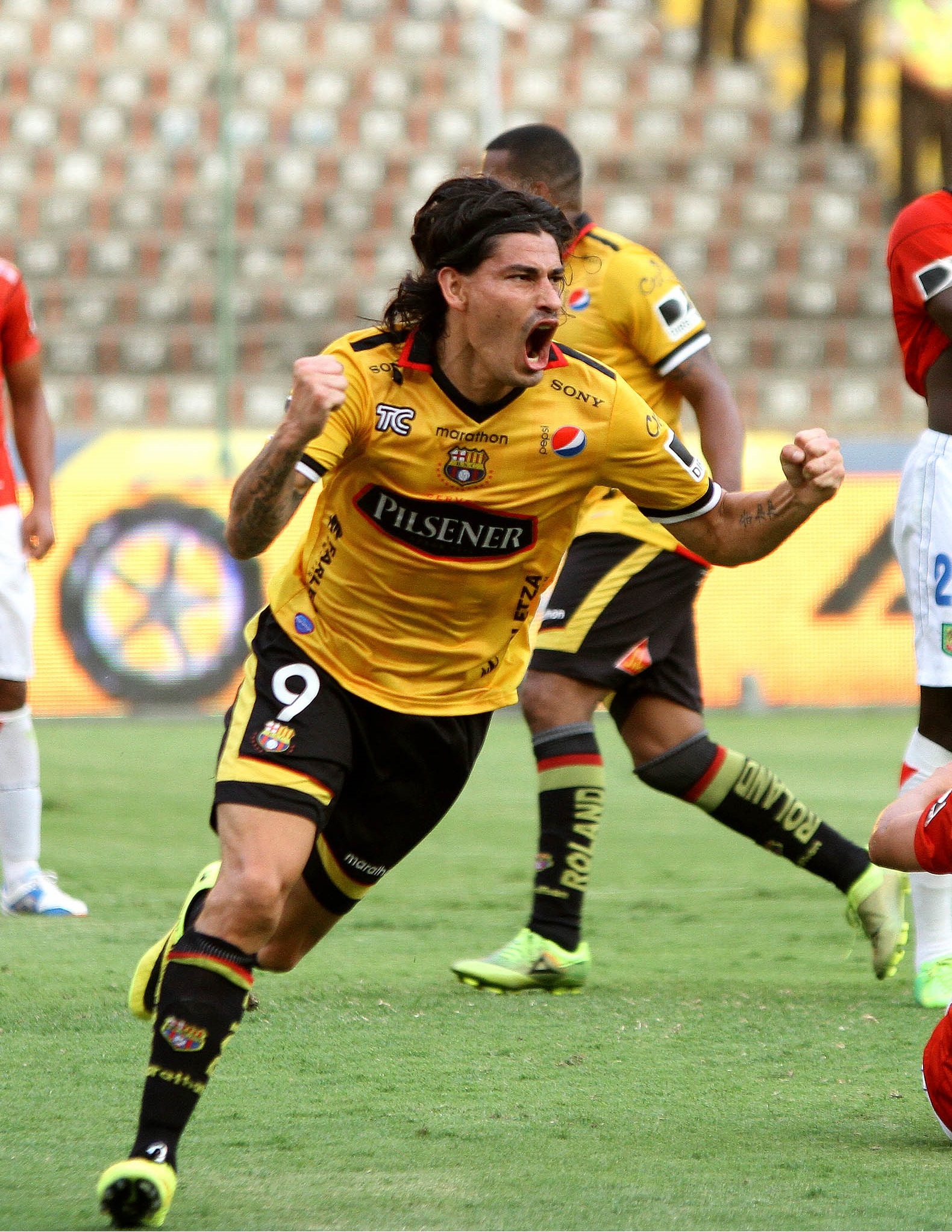
Ismael Blanco

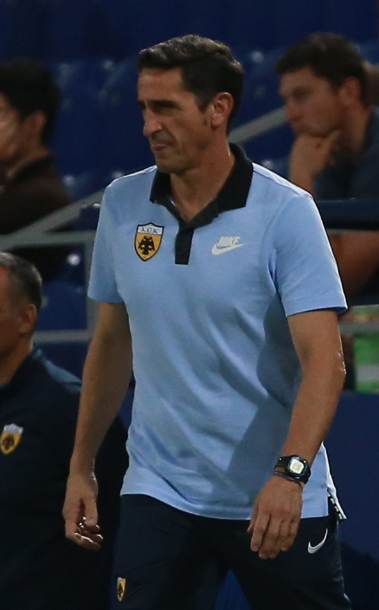
Manolo Jiménez

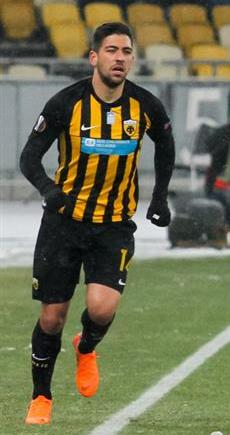
Tasos Bakasetas

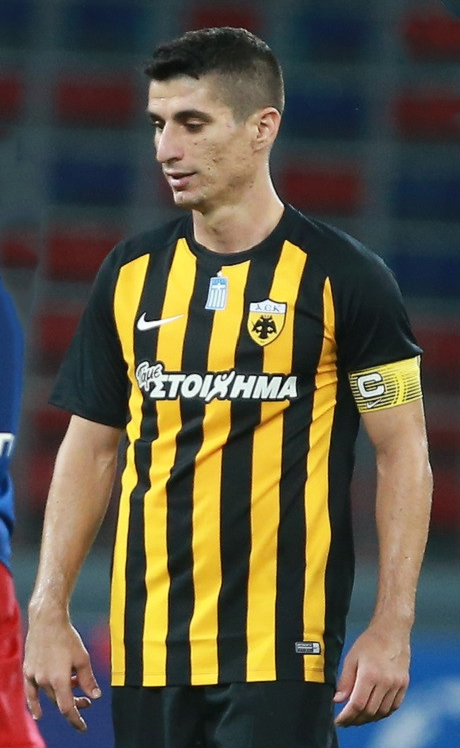
Petros Mantalos

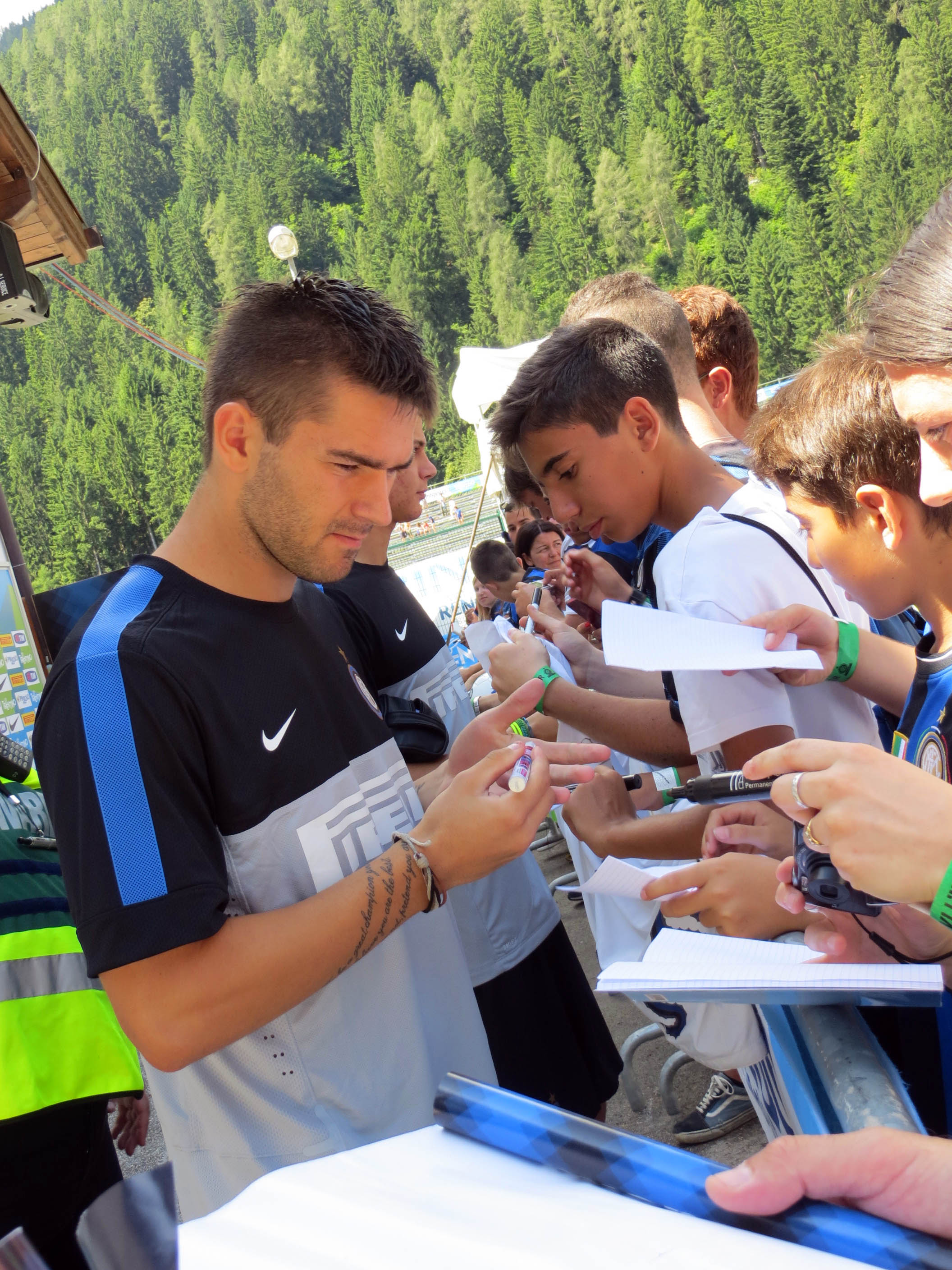
Marko Livaja
Basketball

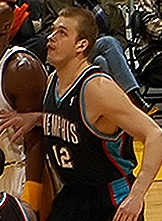
Jake Tsakalidis

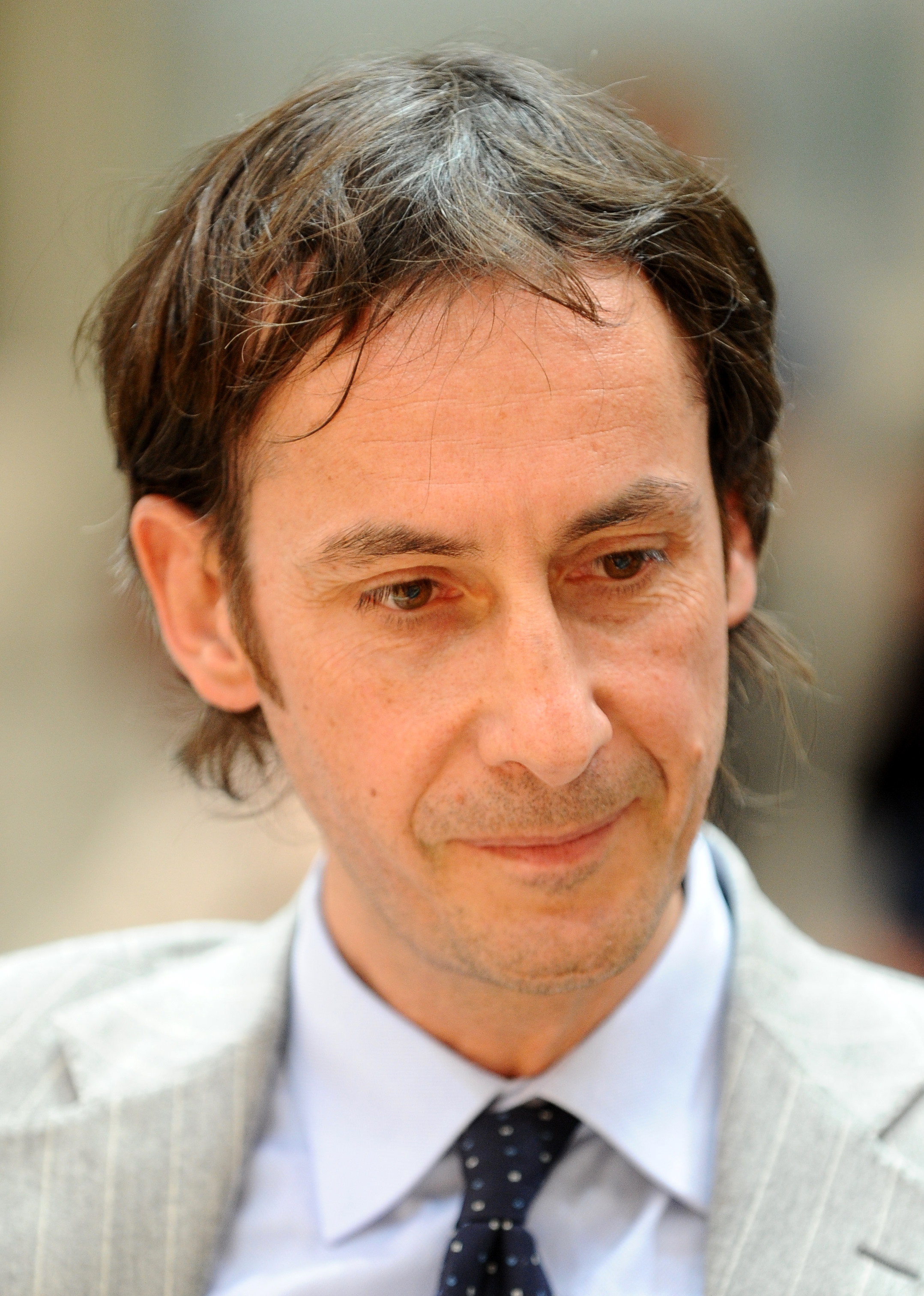
Claudio Coldebella

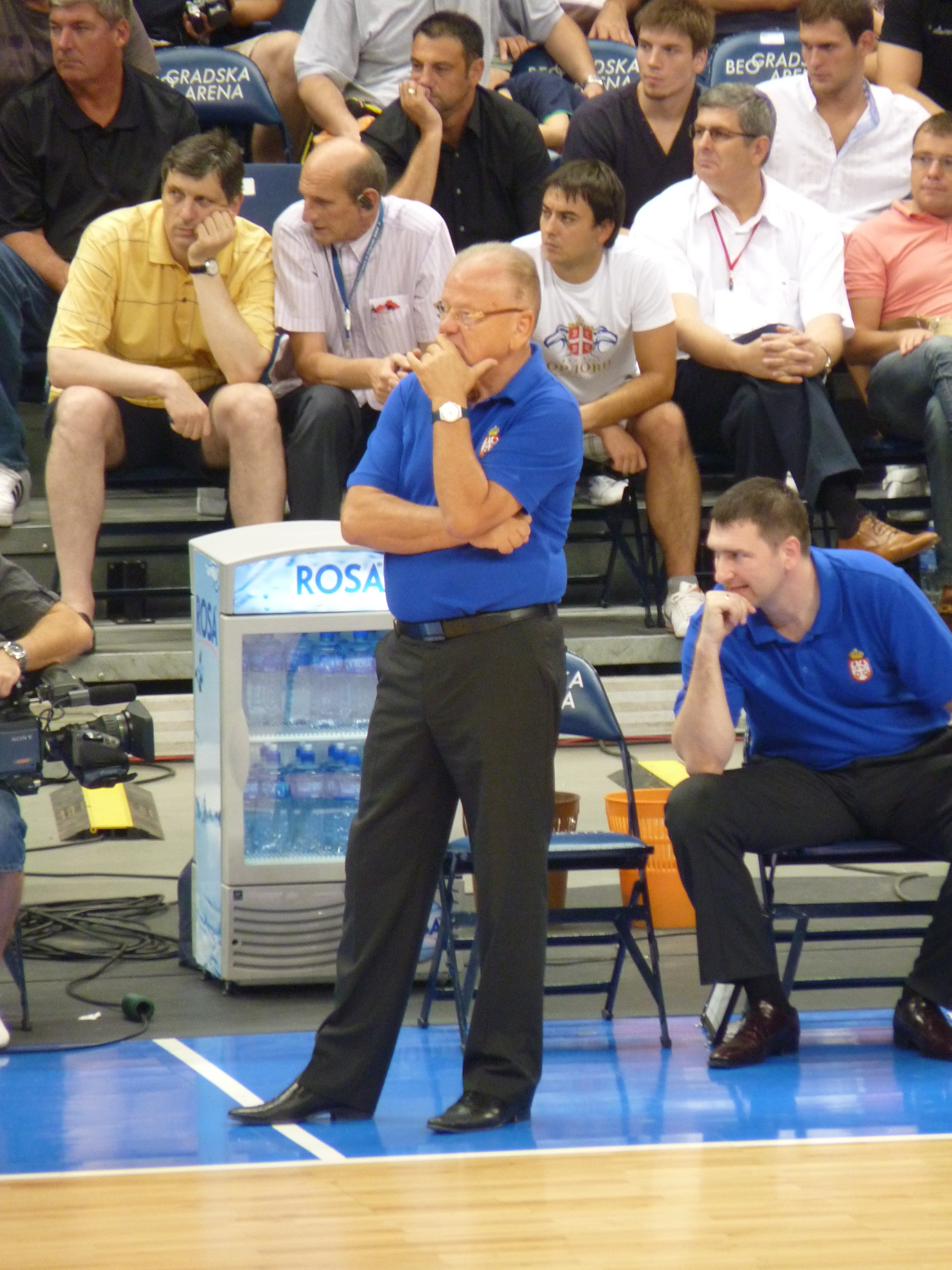
Dušan Ivković

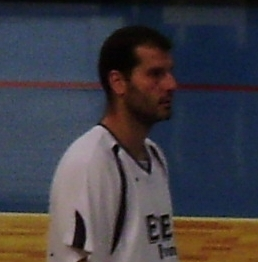
Michalis Kakiouzis

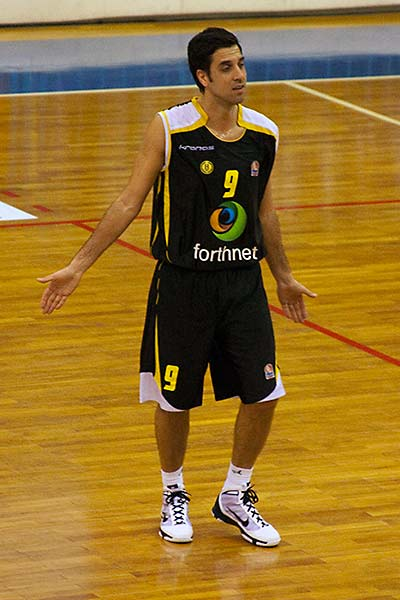
Nikos Chatzis

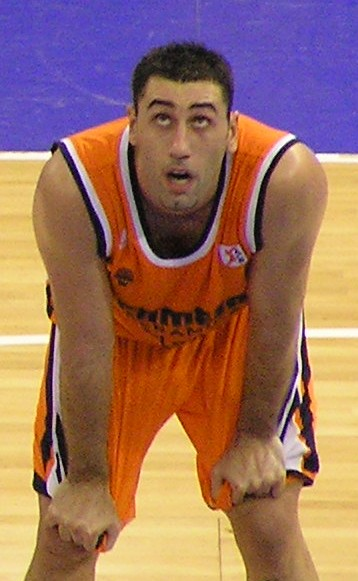
Dimos Dikoudis

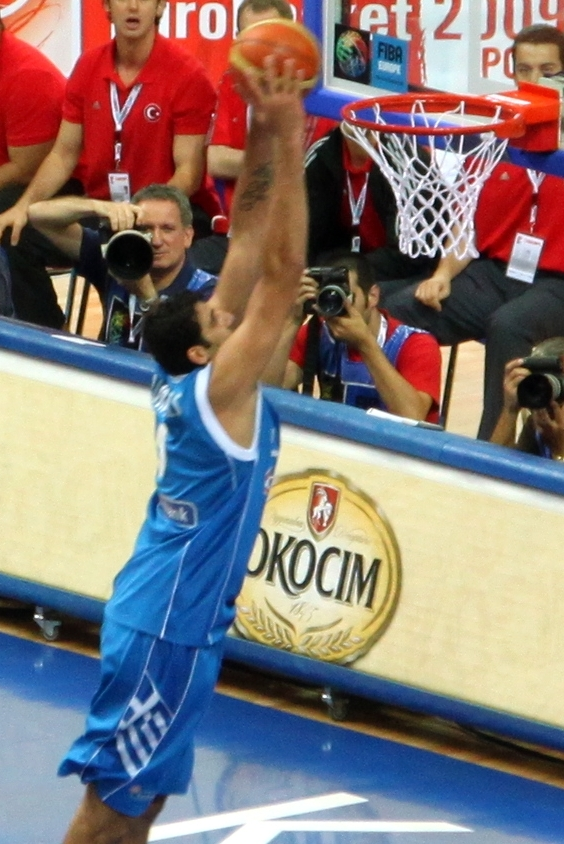
Ioannis Bourousis

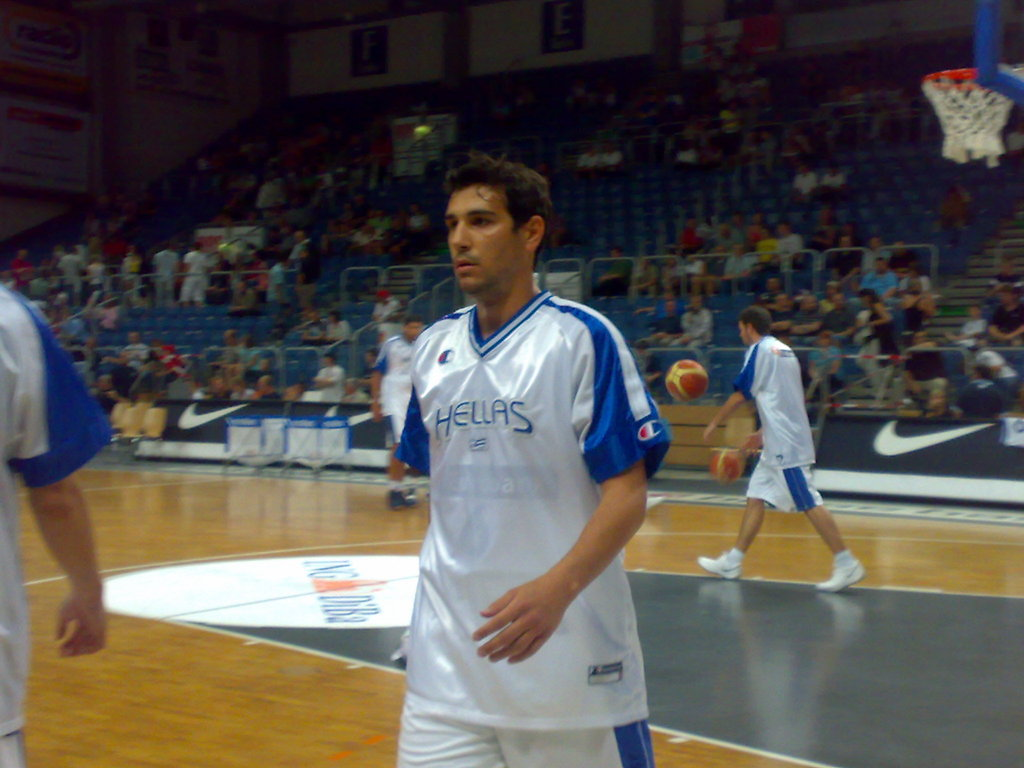
Nikos Zisis

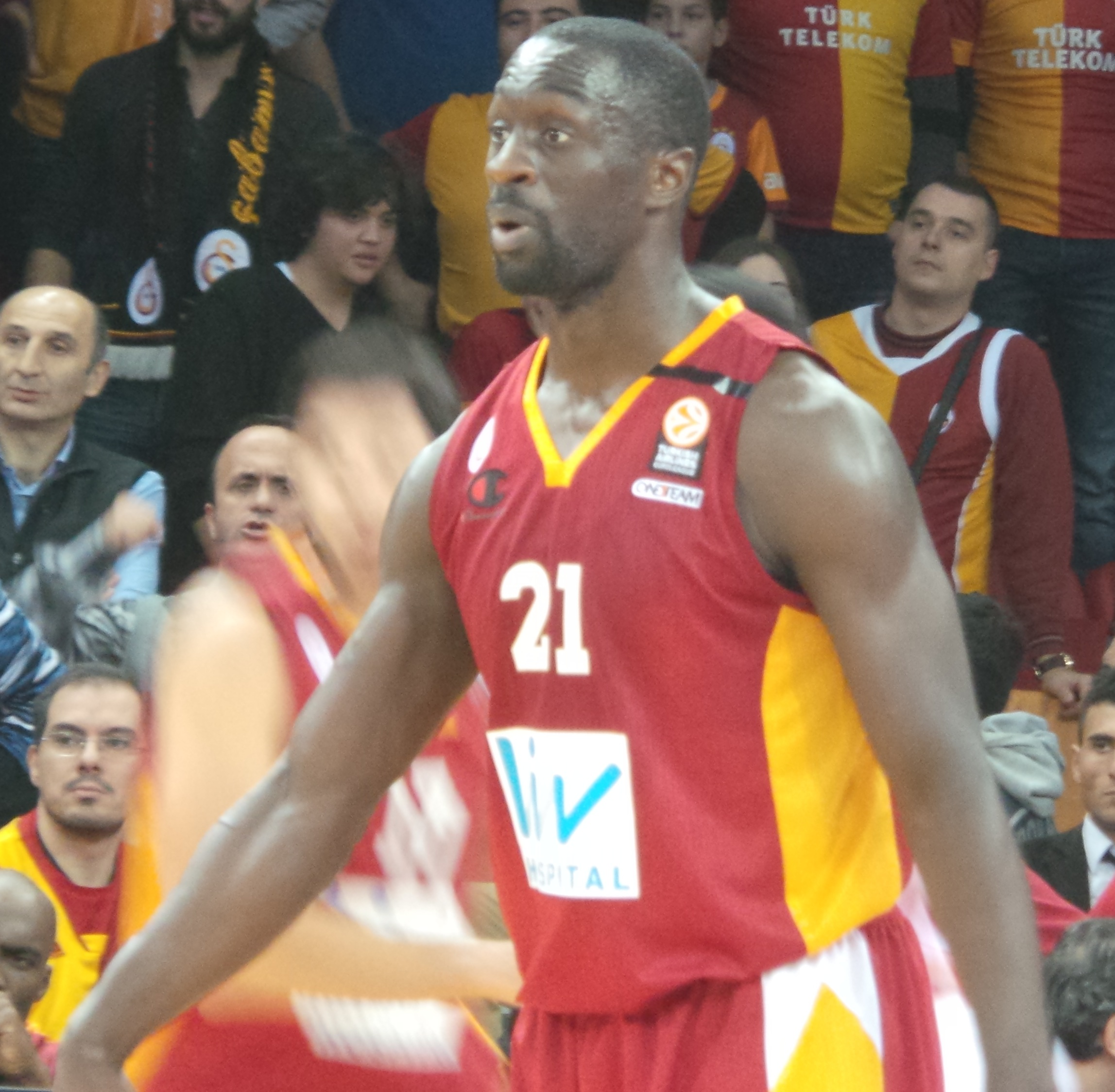
Pops Mensah-Bonsu

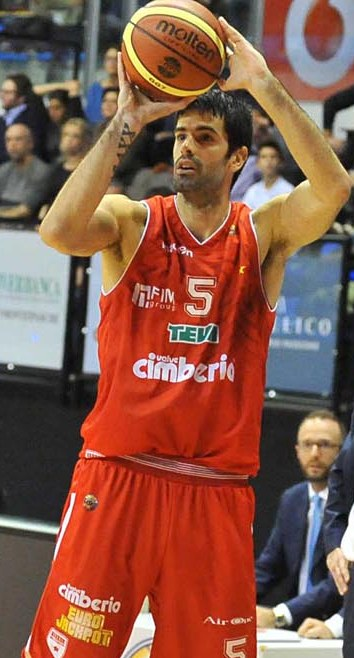
Dušan Šakota

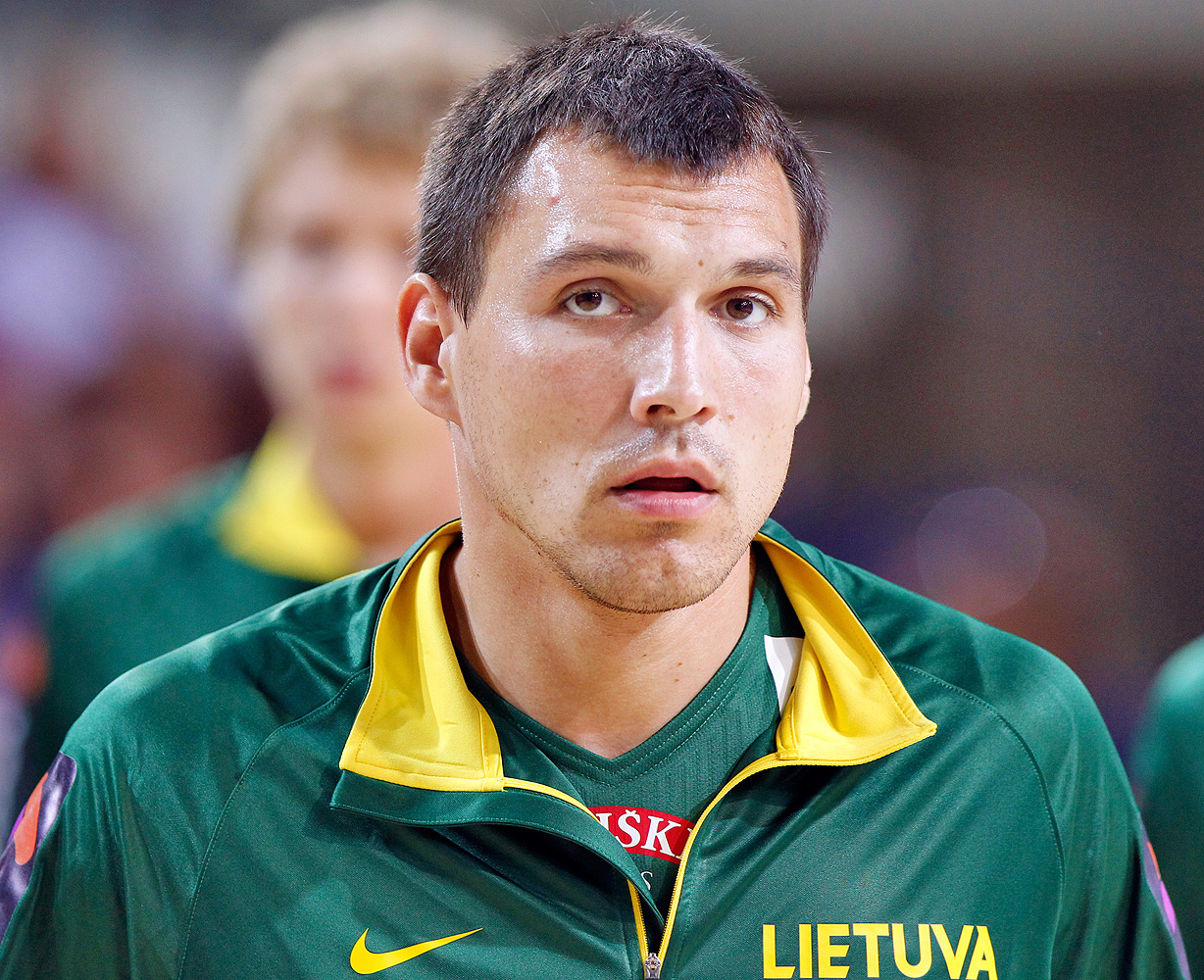
Jonas Mačiulis
Handball

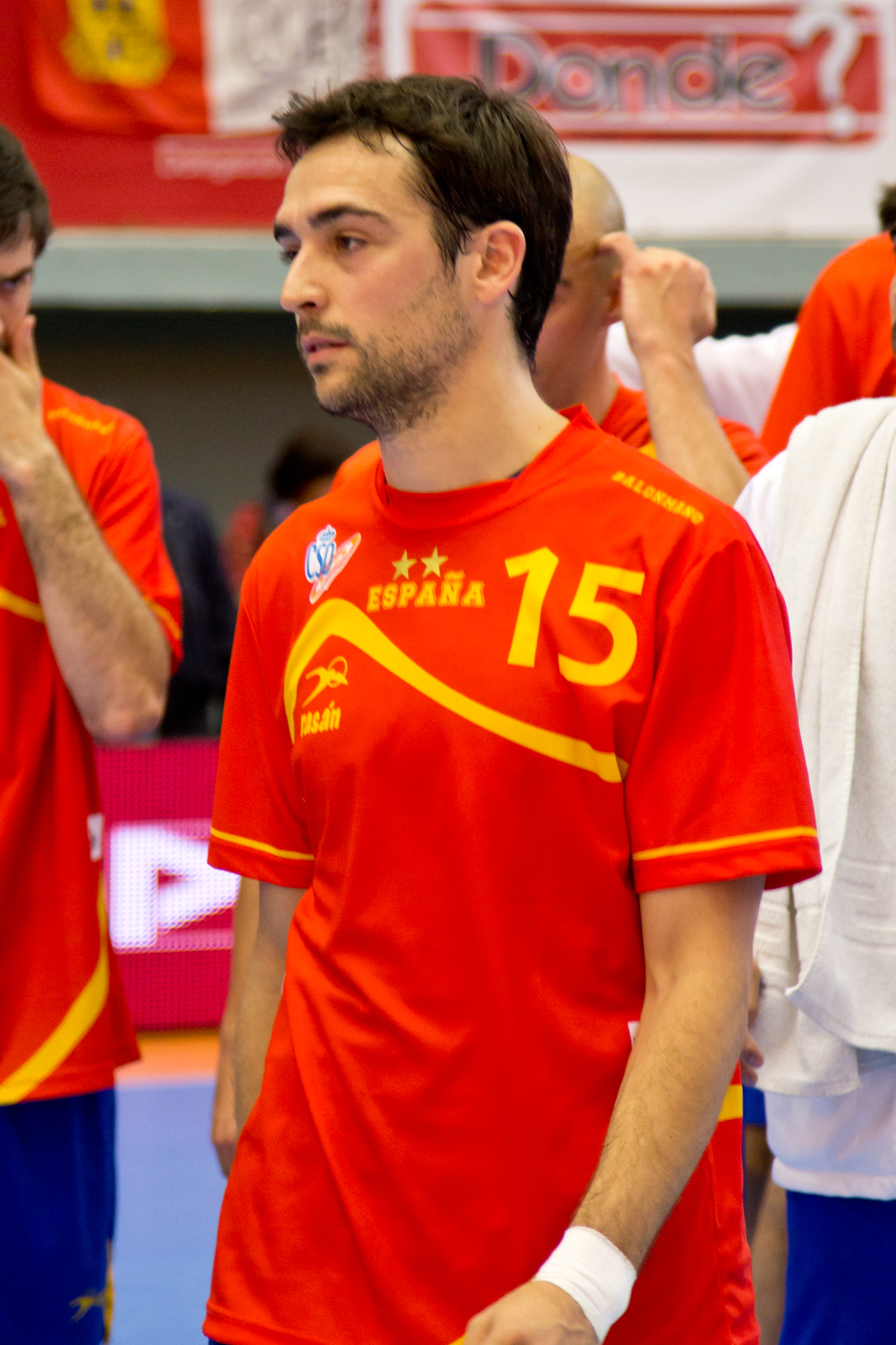
Cristian Ugalde
