= Efimerida ton Syntakton =

Greek daily newspaper

I Efimerida ton Syntakton
- Type: Daily newspaper
- Owner(s): Anexartita Mesa Mazikis Enimerosis SA (51% Dimitris Melissanidis through Zofrank Holdings; 49% staff cooperative)
- Editor-in-chief: Sotiris Maniatis
- Founded: 2012
- Political alignment: Left-wing
- Language: Greek
- City: Athens
- Country: Greece
- Website: www.efsyn.gr

I Efimerida ton Syntakton (Greek: Η Εφημερίδα των Συντακτών, lit. 'The Newspaper of the Editors', also abbreviated as EfSyn) is a Greek daily newspaper, formerly a cooperative. It was founded in November 2012 by a team of former workers of the Eleftherotypia newspaper. In 2025, a majority stake was acquired by Dimitris Melissanidis, also owner of the Naftemporiki media group, through his holding company Zofrank Holdings. The chief editor was Nikolas Voulelis for the newspaper's first decade, and has been Sotiris Maniatis since October 2022.

== History ==
It was founded in 2012, during difficult conditions in the Greek economic crisis, by former Eleftherotypia staff. The venture was supported by volunteers and other professional journalists, as well as columnists in the sciences, politics and culture. The newspaper worked, initially, as a cooperative, allowing it to include a diverse range of opinions and retain its autonomy. All cooperative members were automatically considered workers and received equal pay, except the chief editor Nikolas Voulelis, who received no pay. Wages had a set limit and surpluses would go towards the newspaper's needs and hiring more workers.

The logo of the newspaper's online edition (www.efsyn.gr).

The administration of the cooperative was elected by the workers themselves, who made up the base shareholders in the newspaper, since they owned 97% of the company that published it, Anexartita Mesa Mazikis Enimerosis A.E. (Greek: Ανεξάρτητα Μέσα Μαζικής Ενημέρωσης Α.Ε., lit. 'Independent Mass Media SA').

On 22 September 2025, the general assembly of the cooperative decided unanimously on the sale of 51% of stock of the company to Zofrank Holdings, owned by Dimitris Melissanidis and also owner of the Naftemporiki media group, with the stated purpose of furthering of the newspaper's growth and development.

== Circulation ==
Sales are estimated at 5,000 sheets daily, which makes it the 2nd or 3rd biggest in circulation Greek newspaper. Every Saturday, sales reach around 12,000 to 15,000 sheets which is between the 3rd and 4th place of circulation.

On Saturdays, the newspaper circulates a special edition of the newspaper with the title "Efimerida ton Sintakton - Savatokyriako" (Savatokyriako being a combination of Saturday and Sunday) and it remains in kiosks in both Saturdays and Sundays. Simultaneously it circulates pull-outs for themes related to health, cars, the environment and other interests. In June 2019, the newspaper changed its price to €1.50 for its daily circulation (from a price of €1.30) and to €3.90 for the Saturday edition with offers (from €3.50), keeping its price at €2.00 for the simple edition. From November 2021, until the summer of 2022 it published on a monthly basis the American periodical Rolling Stone, of which it gained the rights to for the Greek edition.

In March 2024, the price of the newspaper was changed again to €2.00 (from €1.50) for the daily sheet, to €2.50 (from €2.00) for the regular edition of Saturday and to €4.25 for the edition with special offers (from €3.90).

== Political alignment ==
On an ideological scale, the Newspaper of the Editors has been described as "left-wing" and "pro-grassroots" and that it represents the "radical" or the "new" left. During the period of the rule of Alexis Tsipras (2015–2019) it often expressed support for the government.
