= AEK Futsal =

Greek futsal club

AEK
- Nicknames: Énosis (Union); Dikéfalos Aetós (Double-Headed Eagle); Kitrinómavri (Yellow-Blacks)
- Short name: AEK
- Founded: 2008; 18 years ago
- Ground: Kamatero Indoor Hall
- Capacity: 800
- President: Alexis Alexiou
- Head coach: Angelos Emmanouilidis
- League: Hellenic Super League
- 2024-25: Regular season: 1st of 13; Playoffs: Champions
- Website: https://www.aek.gr/podosfairo-salas/
Home colours	Away colours

AEK Futsal Club (Greek: Αθλητική Ένωσις Κωνσταντινουπόλεως, romanized: Athlitiki Enosis Konstantinoupoleos, lit. 'Athletic Union of Constantinople'), known simply as A.E.K. (Greek: A.E.K.; [aek]) in Greece and AEK Athens internationally, is a Greek professional futsal club based in Athens, Attica, Greece.

AEK was founded in 2008 as a result of a merger with the O.F. Geraka futsal club and participated in the second division that year. In the 2009–10 season, AEK participated once more in the second division and gained promotion after finishing second in the playoffs. On June 3, 2018, AEK won its first title by triumphing over Olympiada Agia Paraskevi with a score of 1–0 at the 2017–18 Hellenic Futsal Cup final. Over the years, the club has won numerous trophies.

== History ==
=== The years of creation ===
The Futsal section of AEK was initially started when, in cooperation with OF Gerakas in the summer of 2008, the forthcoming merger was launched at the end of the season, since there was no other way, with the dates for the participation of a new club in the 2nd National room. The newly created department undertook to create and organize 5 fans of the Dichefalu, aiming and guiding the presence of AEK, and in the field of the football court. Eventually the team finished second in the 2008–09 season and moved to the 1st National.

However, the Federation's refusal to join AEK for a merger with Gerakas, made the immediate need to create a new division under A.E.K., and to participate again in the 2nd National Championship as a newly established club for the next season 2009–10. The men's team fought in closed Gerakas, winning the first National Division, finishing 1st in the group, relying solely on AEK-winning players, who were chosen among many in summer friendly trials, all out of the box. Reference point: The department has never charged the amateur AEK fund at a cost, as it has survived financially thanks to the help of AEK fans.

=== Creation of Academies ===
In the summer of 2010, the need to create a football academy, which was necessary for the participation of the men's team in the 1st National category, led the department's directors to the first big call of the AEK world through Media, Fun Weekend and advertisements for the creation of a new AEK Academy, for children from 6 years old and over, 7 newly new children, joined the initial scheme of the newly established academy, of various ages, with the right to participate in the infrastructure championship. The men's team finishes in the 7th place of the 1st National Championship, a huge success, in the first prize in this championship, having sent 4 players to the National Team, compensating for their excellent appearances and having their 1st scorer Greek Championship, and reaching the Greek Cup semifinals, losing the qualification to the final in the last minute of the match. The academy now has 1 division of athletes throughout the year, managing to finish with 3 divisions, with 30 children from 6 to 13 years old.

In the summer of 2011 the sudden departure of four international players for a number of reasons, and their inadequate replacement, with other equally professional footballers, since it was the philosophy of the department's officers, brought to the team a great sporting turmoil, resulting in team, to stay early off racing goals, finishing in 10th place. The academy has now begun to grow and as a result it has reached the winner of the Greek Cup in the category of Juniors, defeating Athina 90 with 2–1. Also, the team of Pampas is also giving its 1st presence to the Final 4 Cup, Greece, with the participation of younger players. Thus, the year ends with AEK FC, honoring 25,000 people in the last game of Nikos Liberopoulos and Traianos Dellas, the Juniors team, and celebrating with the fans of AEK.

=== Administrative Changes ===
The next season, 2012–13, was a season of administrative developments in the AEK section of the Salon, as the initial team of the five founding members was leaving the scene for a number of reasons. Thus, in the face of the danger, to dissolve all this effort for 3 years, since one did not undertake to pursue the specific project, the management of the Amateur AEK assigned the department's responsibility to the coach of the men's team and the head of the academy, Dimitris Kountardas as the department's chief, with his immediate partners, Stavros Mavrakis and Manos Hadjidrodis. The men's team is significantly strengthened, with the arrival of 4-5 experienced footballers, moves to its new headquarters, the closed Nicolakakis and the coaching twin, creates a strong team that brings it to the first quarter of the Championship. The academy has more than 150 athletes, of all ages, from 4 to 17 years old, with 4 racing segments EPO departments and eight other leading parties.

=== The first title and European participation ===
On June 3, 2018, AEK celebrated a major accomplishment by winning its first title since its establishment, overcoming Olympiada Agia Paraskevi in a close 1–0 contest during the 2017–18 Hellenic Cup. Earlier that year, the club also won the Hellenic Super Cup for the first time. The subsequent year saw AEK secure its first league championship, a milestone that also allowed the team to participate in the UEFA Futsal Champions League for the very first time. In the early part of that year, the club celebrated its second triumph in the Hellenic Super Cup, further solidifying its reputation in the sport. The 2019 season saw the club triumphantly reclaim the championship title, but they struggled to progress beyond the preliminary round of the UEFA Futsal Champions League, ultimately facing two defeats that hindered their qualification. In the following year, the club achieved a significant milestone by securing its inaugural victory against Araz Naxçivan in the preliminary round of the UEFA Futsal Champions League, allowing them to advance to the round of 32, where they faced disqualification at the hands of Aktobe. Despite this, the achievement represented the club's most significant success in European competition up to that point.

On June 3, 2023, AEK won its second Hellenic Futsal Cup, overcoming AC Doukas in the final. In the two years that followed, the club achieved remarkable success, securing two championships in the Hellenic Futsal Super League along with two Hellenic Super Cup victories. The club also participated in the preliminary round of the 2024–25 UEFA Futsal Champions League. In August 2025, AEK proudly celebrated a historic accomplishment by winning its group in the preliminary round of the 2025–26 UEFA Futsal Champions League. Defeating the respective champions of England, Norway, and Hungary, the club successfully moved on to the main phase of the competition for the first time ever. On August 31, 2025, the club was informed that it would compete against the futsal teams of Meta Catania C5, Akaa, and TSV Weilimdorf in the main round of the 2025–26 UEFA Futsal Champions League.

== Honours ==
AEK Futsal Men's honours aek.gr
Type	Competition	Titles	Winners	Runners-up	Ref.
Domestic	Hellenic Futsal Super League	4	2019, 2020, 2024, 2025	2021, 2022, 2023	
Domestic	Hellenic Futsal Cup	2	2018, 2023	2017, 2024	
Domestic	Hellenic Futsal Super Cup	5	2018, 2019, 2023, 2024, 2025		

AEK Futsal Women's honours aek.gr
Type	Competition	Titles	Winners	Runners-up	Ref.
Domestic	Hellenic Futsal Super League	5	2019, 2023, 2024, 2025, 2026	2021, 2022	
Domestic	Hellenic Futsal Cup	4	2022, 2023, 2025, 2026		
Domestic	Hellenic Futsal Super Cup	2	2022, 2024		

AEK Futsal Youth honours
Type	Competition	Titles	Winners	Runners-up	Ref.
Domestic	U18 Hellenic Youth Super League	1	2022		
Domestic	U18 Hellenic Youth Cup	2	2021, 2023		
Domestic	U14 Hellenic Youth Cup	2	2018, 2022		
Domestic	U13 Hellenic Youth Super League	1^{s}	2023		
Domestic	U12 Hellenic Youth Super League	2	2018, 2022		
Domestic	U12 Hellenic Youth Cup	3	2012, 2019, 2022		
Domestic	U11 Hellenic Youth Super League	3^{s}	2018, 2021, 2024		
Domestic	U11 Hellenic Youth Cup	1	2021		
Domestic	U10 Hellenic Youth Super League	1	2019		
Domestic	U10 Hellenic Youth Cup	3	2018, 2022, 2023		
Domestic	U9 Hellenic Youth Super League	1	2021		
Domestic	U9 Hellenic Youth Cup	1^{s}	2022		

- record
- ^{S} Shared record

== Recent seasons ==
Season	Division	Place	Cup	Super Cup	Notes
2008–09	A2 Ethniki	2nd			
2009–10	A2 Ethniki	2nd			promoted to A1
2010–11	A1 Ethniki	8th			
2011–12	A1 Ethniki	10th			
2012–13	A1 Ethniki	6th			
2013–14	Hellenic Super League	7th			
2014–15	Hellenic Super League	5th			
2015–16	Hellenic Super League	10th			
2016–17	Hellenic Super League	3rd	Finalist		
2017–18	Hellenic Super League	3rd	Winner	Winner	
2018–19	Hellenic Super League	1st		Winner	
2019–20	Hellenic Super League	1st			
2020–21	Hellenic Super League	2nd			
2021–22	Hellenic Super League	2nd			
2022–23	Hellenic Super League	2nd	Winner		
2023–24	Hellenic Super League	1st	Finalist	Winner	
2024–25	Hellenic Super League	1st		Winner	

== European performance ==
=== Best seasons ===
Season	Manager	Round	Eliminated by	Results
UEFA Futsal Champions League
2020–21	(Greece) Ioannis Ziavas	Round of 32	(Kazakhstan) MFC Aktobe	2–5 (L) in Athens
2025–26	(Greece) Angelos Emmanouilidis	Round of 16	(Portugal) Sporting CP	0–11 (L) in Lavrio, 8–3 (L) in Lisbon

=== Match table ===
Last update: 13 February 2026

Season	Competition	Round	Country	Opponent	Home	Away	Venue	Agg.	Qual.	Ref.
2019–20	UEFA Futsal Champions League	Preliminary Round	(Switzerland)	Futsal Minerva		4–3	Dais Athletic Center, Athens	4th		
2019–20	UEFA Futsal Champions League	Preliminary Round	(Republic of Ireland)	Blue Magic FCD	4–4		Dais Athletic Center, Athens	4th		
2019–20	UEFA Futsal Champions League	Preliminary Round	(Romania)	FK Miercurea Ciuc	3–4		Dais Athletic Center, Athens	4th		
2020–21	UEFA Futsal Champions League	Preliminary Round	(Azerbaijan)	Araz Naxçivan	3–3 (4–3 p)		Dais Athletic Center, Athens	7–6		
2020–21	UEFA Futsal Champions League	Round of 32	(Kazakhstan)	MFC Aktobe	2–5		Dais Athletic Center, Athens	2–5		
2024–25	UEFA Futsal Champions League	Preliminary Round	(Austria)	FC Diamant Linz	1–3		Sporthalle NMS Linz-Kleinmünchen, Linz	2nd		
2024–25	UEFA Futsal Champions League	Preliminary Round	(Cyprus)	AEL Limassol	5–4		Sporthalle NMS Linz-Kleinmünchen, Linz	2nd		
2024–25	UEFA Futsal Champions League	Preliminary Round	(Scotland)	Aberdeen		1–3	Sporthalle NMS Linz-Kleinmünchen, Linz	2nd		
2025–26	UEFA Futsal Champions League	Preliminary Round	(Norway)	Sjarmtrollan		1–8	OAKA Kasimatis Hall, Athens	1st		
2025–26	UEFA Futsal Champions League	Preliminary Round	(England)	Bolton	9–0		OAKA Kasimatis Hall, Athens	1st		
2025–26	UEFA Futsal Champions League	Preliminary Round	(Hungary)	Veszprém	6–4		OAKA Kasimatis Hall, Athens	1st		
2025–26	UEFA Futsal Champions League	Main Round	(Italy)	Meta Catania C5		3–3	PalaCatania, Catania	1st		
2025–26	UEFA Futsal Champions League	Main Round	(Finland)	Akaa		2–6	PalaCatania, Catania	1st		
2025–26	UEFA Futsal Champions League	Main Round	(Germany)	TSV Weilimdorf	9–2		PalaCatania, Catania	1st		
2025–26	UEFA Futsal Champions League	Round of 16	(Portugal)	Sporting CP	0–11	8–3	Lavrio Indoor Hall, Lavrio; Pavilhão João Rocha, Lisbon	3–19		

- Single games are considered home or away according to the team's allocation after a UEFA competition draw.

=== Overall record ===
Competition	Home								Away								Total							
Competition	Pld	W	D	L	GF	GA	GD	Win%	Pld	W	D	L	GF	GA	GD	Win%	Pld	W	D	L	GF	GA	GD	Win%
UEFA Futsal Champions League	10	5	1	4	46	43	+3	50.00	6	3	1	2	26	19	+7	50.00	16	8	2	6	72	62	+10	50.00
Total	10	5	1	4	46	43	+3	50.00	6	3	1	2	26	19	+7	50.00	16	8	2	6	72	62	+10	50.00

Last updated: 13 February 2016
Source: uefa.com

=== Record by country of opposition ===
Country	Home							Away							Total							
Country	Pld	W	D	L	GF	GA	GD	Pld	W	D	L	GF	GA	GD	Pld	W	D	L	GF	GA	GD	Win%
Austria	1	0	0	1	1	3	-2	0	0	0	0	0	0	0	1	0	0	1	1	3	-2	00.00
Azerbaijan	1	1	0	0	7	6	+1	0	0	0	0	0	0	0	1	1	0	0	7	6	+1	100.00
Cyprus	1	1	0	0	5	4	+1	0	0	0	0	0	0	0	1	1	0	0	5	4	+1	100.00
England	1	1	0	0	9	0	+9	0	0	0	0	0	0	0	1	1	0	0	9	0	+9	100.00
Finland	0	0	0	0	0	0	0	1	1	0	0	6	2	+4	1	1	0	0	6	2	+4	100.00
Germany	1	1	0	0	9	2	+7	0	0	0	0	0	0	0	1	1	0	0	9	2	+7	100.00
Hungary	1	1	0	0	6	4	+2	0	0	0	0	0	0	0	1	1	0	0	6	4	+2	100.00
Ireland	1	0	1	0	4	4	0	0	0	0	0	0	0	0	1	0	1	0	4	4	0	50.00
Italy	0	0	0	0	0	0	0	1	0	1	0	3	3	0	1	0	1	0	3	3	0	50.00
Kazakhstan	1	0	0	1	2	5	-3	0	0	0	0	0	0	0	1	0	0	1	2	5	-3	00.00
Norway	0	0	0	0	0	0	0	1	1	0	0	8	1	+7	1	1	0	0	8	1	+7	100.00
Portugal	1	0	0	1	0	11	-11	1	0	0	1	3	8	-5	2	0	0	2	3	19	-16	00.00
Romania	1	0	0	1	3	4	-1	0	0	0	0	0	0	0	1	0	0	1	3	4	-1	00.00
Scotland	0	0	0	0	0	0	0	1	1	0	0	3	1	+2	1	1	0	0	3	1	+2	100.00
Switzerland	0	0	0	0	0	0	0	1	0	0	1	3	4	-1	1	0	0	1	3	4	-1	00.00
Total	10	5	1	4	46	43	+3	6	3	1	2	26	19	+7	16	8	2	6	72	62	+15	50.00

Last updated: 13 February 2026
Source: uefa.com

- Last entry is the second match against Sporting CP for the 2025–26 UEFA Futsal Champions League round of 16.
- The record after the last entry is 16 matches in total (8W, 2D, 6L, GF72, GA62), with 10 home matches (5W, 1D, 4L, GF46, GA43) and 6 away matches (3W, 1D, 2L, GF26, GA19).
- Single games are considered home or away according to the team's allocation after a UEFA competition draw.

== Players ==
=== Current squad ===
Last Update: 27 August 2025

#	Position	Name	Nationality
15	Goalkeeper	Nikolaos Aronis (c)	(Greece)
89	Goalkeeper	Efthimios Michalitsis	(Greece)
13	Goalkeeper	Dimitris Petrakis	(Greece)
3	Defender	Michail Angelos Protonotarios	(Greece)
6	Defender	Andreas Tarnanidis	(Greece)
8	Defender	Panagiotis Gousis	(Greece)
10	Defender	Vitinho	(Armenia)
19	Defender	Nikolaos Triantafyllos	(Greece)
20	Defender	Dimitrios Anastasopoulos	(Greece)
27	Defender	Nenê	(Brazil)
77	Defender	Fabricio Lima	(Brazil)
7	Forward	Marios Ntatis	(Greece)
11	Forward	Georgios Kokkinidis	(Greece)
17	Forward	Alexandros Adamopoulos	(Greece)
23	Forward	Felipinho	(Brazil)

== Personnel ==
Technical & Academies staff
	Name	Post
(Greece)	Angelos Emmanouilidis	Head coach
(Italy)	Andrea Candeloro	Technical director
(Greece)	Stavridis Nikos	Under 15 coach
(Greece)	Stavridis Nikos	Academies coach
(Greece)	Stratos Iatrou	Academies coach

== Notable coaches ==
- Apostolos Beltsidis
- Giannis Ziavas

== List of former and current players ==
Criteria

To appear in this section a player must have either:

- Played at least one season for the club.
- Set a club record or won an individual award while at the club.
- Played at least one official international match for their national team at any time.
- Performed successfully during his period in the club or at later/previous stages of his career.

Greece

- Tolis Ntelos
- Vasileios Koutsilas
- Nikos Pavlou
- Christos Achis
- Nikolaos Aronis
- Efthimios Michalitsis
- Dimitris Petrakis
- Michail Protonotarios
- Andreas Tarnanidis
- Panagiotis Gousis
- Nikolaos Triantafyllos
- Dimitrios Anastasopoulos
- Marios Ntatis
- Georgios Kokkinidis
- Alexandros Adamopoulos

Rest of Europe

- Luka Vuletić
- Hugo Ramada Martins

Americas

- Wesley Estêvão
- Nenê
- Fabricio Lima
- Felipinho
- Vitinho

== Sponsorships ==
- Great Sponsor: PhysiOsteo
- Official Sport Clothing Manufacturer: Macron
