= Aegean Oil =

Greek oil company

Aegean Oil S.A.
- Native name: ΑΙΓΑΙΟΝ ΟΙΛ Α.Ε.
- Type: Anonymi Etairia
- Industry: Petroleum industry
- Founded: 1999
- Founder: Dimitris Melisanidis
- Headquarters: 10 Akti Kondyli & 59 Kastoros 18545, Piraeus, Athens, Greece
- Number of locations: 493 stores (2018); 700+ (2022)
- Area served: Greece
- Key people: Dimitris Melissanidis (owner)
- Services: Fuel gas stations, oil tankers, planes
- Revenue: €548'380 (2005); ▲ approx. €1bn.; (2017)
- Number of employees: 80 (2009); ▲2,500 (2022)
- Subsidiaries: Temeteron Ltd.

Aegean Oil S.A. (Greek: ΑΙΓΑΙΟΝ ΟΙΛ A.E.) is a Greek oil company owned by the Melissanidis family. It was an affiliated company of Aegean Marine Petroleum Network Inc. (AMPNI). Aegean Oil began its activities in the retail market in the early 2000 and became known for a network of gas stations opened throughout Greece. As of 2022, Aegean Oil has more than 700 gas stations across Greece.

As of July 2024, Aegean Oil delivers oil to the ports of Piraeus, Elefsis and Patras by operating six barges/tankers, namely; Aegean Ace, Aegean III, Aegean VIII, Aegean Tiffany, Aegean Dolphin and Kohyli.

== See also ==
- Energy in Greece
