= Konstantinos Spanoudis =

Greek politician and journalist

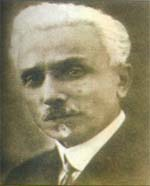

1st president of AEK Athens
- In office 13 April 1924 – 1933
- Succeeded by: Konstantinos Konstantaras

Personal details
- Born: 1871 Fanari, Constantinople
- Died: 24 April 1941 (aged 69–70) Athens, Greece
- Spouse: Sofia Ioannidis
- Children: Athina Spanoudis
- Occupation: Politician, Journalist
- Known for: Founder of AEK Athens; Member of the Hellenic Parliament

Konstantinos Spanoudis (Greek: Κωνσταντίνος Σπανούδης; 1871 – 24 April 1941) was a Greek politician of the Liberal Party, journalist and the first president of AEK sports club.

== Biography ==
Spanoudis was born in 1871 in Fanari, Constantinople. A graduate of the Phanar Greek Orthodox College, he studied Political science in Paris. After completing his studies he returned to Istanbul and devoted himself to journalism. In 1904 he started publishing the newspaper "Progress", the patriotic character of which cost him persecution and two expulsions.

He joined the Greek Liberal Party and became close associate of Prime Minister Eleftherios Venizelos during the military operations of Greece in the Balkan Wars and World War I.

After the Asia Minor Catastrophe he settled in Athens. In 1924 he and other Constantinopolitans founded Athletic Union of Constantinople (A.E.K.) (Greek: Αθλητική Ένωσις Κωνσταντινουπόλεως) and Spanoudis became the first President of the new club. In 1932 he was elected MP with the Liberal Party and at the same time he kept his position at the administration of AEK until 1933.

He died on 24 April 1941 in Athens.

== Personal life ==
In 1910, Spanoudis married a distinguished music critic, Sofia Ioannidis. Together they had one daughter, Athina (1921–1998), who was a radio producer for 35 years at ERT. In October 2008, the Municipality of Athens honored Spanoudis, giving his name to the square located next to the metro station at Kato Patisia.
