= Minerva Bunkering =

Petroleum refining and trading company

- Formerly: Aegean Marine Petroleum Network Inc.
- Company type: Subsidiary
- Traded as: Athex: AMP; NYSE: ANW
- Industry: Petroleum industry
- Predecessors: Aegean Marine Petroleum Network Inc. Minerva Bunkers Pte Ltd.
- Founded: 1995; 31 years ago in Athens, Greece as AMPNI; 2014; 12 years ago in Singapore as Minerva Bunkers Pte Ltd. 2019; 7 years ago in Singapore as Minerva Bunkering
- Founder: Dimitris Melissanidis (founder of AMPNI); Mercuria (founder of Minerva Bunkers and Minerva Bunkering)
- Headquarters: Geneva, Switzerland
- Area served: Worldwide
- Key people: Tyler Baron (CEO)
- Products: Maritime fuels
- Services: Bunkering
- Number of employees: 850 (2018)
- Parent: Mercuria Energy Group
- Website: minervabunkering.com

Minerva Bunkering is a supplier of marine fuels and bunkering services headquartered in Geneva, Switzerland. It was founded in 2019 as a wholly owned subsidiary of Mercuria Energy Group. It quickly absorbed the larger Aegean Marine Petroleum Network (AMPNI), a public company listed on the New York Stock Exchange, when Aegean was acquired by Mercuria, and Minerva Bunkers, another subsidiary of Mercuria founded in 2014

== History ==
Roots of Minerva Bunkering go back to Aegean Marine Petroleum Network (AMPNI), established in 1995 by Dimitris Melissanidis in Piraeus, Greece, and Minerva Bunkers Pte Ltd., established in December 2014 by Mercuria in Singapore. Aegean Marine Petroleum Network started to operate with one bunkering station in the Port of Piraeus. The second bunkering station was opened in Gibraltar in 1997, followed by stations in Fujairah (2001), Kingston, Kingston (2005), Singapore (2006), and other locations around the world. In 2006, it was listed in New York Stock Exchange through a public offering.

Minerva Bunkers began with a core group of more than 40 marine fuel specialists who came from the bankrupt Danish ship-fuel supplier OW Bunker in December 2014.

In August 2018, Mercuria Energy Group acquired almost one-third of AMPNI's shares. In October 2018, an audit revealed substantial accounting problems at Aegean, to the tune of US$300 million. Aegean Marine commenced its Chapter 11 process in November 2018, reorganizing in order to improve its liquidity. Under the terms of the restructuring deal, Mercuria Energy Group received 100% of the common equity of the reorganized company. The US Bankruptcy Court approved of the company's reorganization plan in March 2019. Consequently, Aegean Marine was acquired by Mercuria, and its assets were taken over by the newly Minerva Bunkering. Correspondingly, the headquarters of the company was moved to Geneva, Switzerland.

== Operations ==
Minerva Bunkering is a marine fuel logistics company that physically supplies and markets refined marine fuel and lubricants to ships in port and at sea. It operates from hubs in Geneva, Athens, New York, Singapore, Antwerp and Las Palmas.

Recently Minerva Bunkering Expanded Presence in Americas with Bomin Acquisition.

== See also ==
- Aegean Oil
- Energy in Greece
