= Hellenic Futsal Cup =

Men's futsal cup in Greece

- Organiser(s): Futsal Clubs Association
- Founded: 2000; 26 years ago
- Region: Greece
- Related competitions: Hellenic Futsal Super League
- Current champions: A.C. Doukas (9th title)
- Most championships: A.C. Doukas (9 titles)
- Website: epssalas.gr
- 2025–26

The Hellenic Futsal Cup is a men's futsal competition in Greece, organized by the Futsal Clubs Association. It started in the 2000–01 season and the first winner was A.C. Doukas. The most successful club so far is A.C. Doukas which has won 9 cups. The 2025−26 cup winner is A.C. Doukas.

== Cup finals ==
Season	Winner	Score	Runner-up
2000−01	A.C. Doukas	8−7	Athina 90
2001−02	Athina 90	6−3	A.C. Doukas
2002−03	A.C. Doukas	5−4	Keratsini
2003−04	A.C. Doukas	4−0	Athina 90
2004−05	Not held		
2005−06	Not held		
2006−07	Athina 90	4−2	GS Ilioupoli
2007−08	A.C. Platon	3−1	Athina 90
2008−09	GS Ilioupoli	5−4	Athina 90
2009−10	Athina 90	4−1	A.C. Doukas
2010−11	Athina 90	5−3	Olympiada Agia Paraskevi
2011−12	Athina 90	3−1	GS Ilioupoli
2012−13	Athina 90	2−0	Olympiada Agia Paraskevi
2013−14	Olympiada Agia Paraskevi	3−1	Athina 90
2014−15	A.C. Doukas	8−4	Yperion Glyka Nera
2015−16	Yperion Glyka Nera	6−4	Proteas Zografou
2016−17	Athina 90	5−4	AEK Athens
2017–18	AEK Athens	1–0	Olympiada Agia Paraskevi
2018–19	A.C. Doukas	3–1	Panathinaikos Futsal
2019−20	Not held		
2020–21	Ermis Zografou	3–1	Hnioxos POASA
2021–22	A.C. Doukas	5–2	Ermis Zografou
2022–23	AEK Athens	3–2	A.C. Doukas
2023–24	A.C. Doukas	9–6	AEK Athens
2024–25	A.C. Doukas	4–1	Ermis Zografou
2025–26	A.C. Doukas	5–2	Salamina

=== Performance by club ===
Club	Cups	Season(s)	Finalist
A.C. Doukas	9	2001, 2003, 2004, 2015, 2019, 2022, 2024, 2025, 2026	3
Athina 90	7	2002, 2007, 2010, 2011, 2012, 2013, 2017	4
AEK Athens	2	2018, 2023	2
Olympiada Agia Paraskevi	1	2014	3
GS Ilioupoli	1	2009	2
Yperion Glyka Nera	1	2016	1
Ermis Zografou	1	2021	2
A.C. Platon	1	2008	–
Keratsini	–	–	1
Proteas Zografou	–	–	1
Panathinaikos Futsal	–	–	1
Hnioxos POASA	–	–	1
Salamina	–	–	1

== Super Cup finals ==
Season	Winner	Score	Runner-up
2013–14	Athina 90	5–2	Olympiada Agia Paraskevi
2017–18	AEK Athens	4–3	A.C. Doukas
2018–19	AEK Athens	5–2	A.C. Doukas
2020–21	A.C. Doukas	6–1	Ermis Zografou
2021–22	A.C. Doukas	3–1	Ermis Zografou
2022–23	AEK Athens	5–4	A.C. Doukas
2023–24	AEK Athens	5–4	A.C. Doukas

=== Performance by club ===
Teams	Cups	Finalist
AEK Athens	5	–
A.C. Doukas	2	4
Athina 90	1	–
Ermis Zografou	–	2
Olympiada Agia Paraskevi	–	1

== See also ==
- Hellenic Futsal Super League
