= Panathinaikos Futsal =

Panathinaikos
- Full name: Παναθηναϊκός Αθλητικός Όμιλος; Panathinaïkós Athlitikós Ómilos (All-Athenian Athletic Club)
- Nicknames: I Prásini (The Greens); To Trifýlli (The Shamrock)
- Founded: 8 August 2017 (9 years, 80 days old); 19 May 2022 (re-establishment)
- Ground: Mets Indoor Hall
- Capacity: 1,200
- President: Dimitris Vranopoulos
- Head coach: Giannis Mostrios
- League: Hellenic Futsal Super League
- 2025–26: Hellenic Futsal Super League, 9th
- Website: pao1908.com
Home colours	Away colours

Panathinaikos futsal is the futsal department of the Greek multisport club Panathinaikos.

== History ==
The first establishment of the futsal department dates back to the late 1990s, having success in the youth levels of the sport. Nevertheless, the effort did not last long enough.

On 8 August 2017 a merge with Athina 90, the most successful futsal team in Greece was announced. It was based on a 5-year deal between the two clubs and the department would compete in the Hellenic Futsal Premiere League, the top tier futsal league in the country.

On 19 May 2022, Panathinaikos announced that the club would be independently reestablished from scratch and would start from the last division of the local competitions.

== Honours ==
- Futsal League 2
  - Winner (1): 2022–23

== Players ==
=== Current squad ===
As of 22 September 2026

Note: Flags indicate national team as defined under FIFA eligibility rules; some limited exceptions apply. Players may hold more than one non-FIFA nationality.

No.	Pos.	Nation	Player
—	GK	LAT	Igors Labuts
—		GRE	Christos Versniak
—		GRE	Dimosthenis Aggelinas

No.	Pos.	Nation	Player
—		GRE	Panos Kolentzos
—		GRE	Dimitris Spanoudakis
—		BRA	Diego Neres

== Technical and managerial staff ==
Position	Staff
Head coach	(Greece) Giannis Mostrios
