= Hellenic Futsal Super League =

First-tier men's futsal league in Greece

Futsal Super League
- Organising body: Futsal Clubs Association
- Founded: 1997; 29 years ago
- First season: 1997–98
- Country: Greece
- Confederation: UEFA
- Number of clubs: 12
- Level on pyramid: 1
- Relegation to: Beta Ethniki
- Domestic cup: Hellenic Futsal Cup
- International cup: UEFA Futsal Champions League
- Current champions: A.C. Doukas (7th title) (2025–26)
- Most championships: Athina 90 (15 titles)
- Website: epssalas.gr
- Current: 2025–26

The Hellenic Futsal Super League is the first-tier men's futsal league in Greece, organized by the Futsal Clubs Association. The most successful club is Athina 90 with 15 titles. A.C. Doukas is the current champion, having won 7 titles.

== 2024–25 season teams ==
- A.E.K. Athens
- Athina 90
- A.C. Doukas
- Ermis Zografou
- A.P.S. Kompra
- Larisa Futsal
- A.O. Neo Ikonio
- Panathinaikos
- Pegasus Agia Paraskevi
- G.S. Salamina
- P.A.S. Lamia
- P.A.S. Trikala
- Trachones Alimos

== Champions by year ==
Season	Winner
1997–98	Athina 90
1998–99	Kosmos Voria Proastia
1999–00	Athina 90
2000–01	A.C. Doukas
2001–02	Athina 90
2002–03	Athina 90
2003–04	Not finished
2004–05	Not finished
2005–06	Athina 90
2006–07	Athina 90
2007–08	Athina 90
2008–09	Athina 90
2009–10	Athina 90
2010–11	Athina 90
2011–12	Athina 90
2012–13	Athina 90
2013–14	Athina 90
2014–15	Athina 90
2015–16	Athina 90
2016–17	A.C. Doukas
2017–18	A.C. Doukas
2018–19	Α.Ε.Κ. Athens
2019–20	Α.Ε.Κ. Athens
2020–21	A.C. Doukas
2021–22	A.C. Doukas
2022–23	A.C. Doukas
2023–24	Α.Ε.Κ. Athens
2024–25	Α.Ε.Κ. Athens
2025–26	A.C. Doukas

=== Performance by club ===
Club	Titles	Season(s)
Athina 90	15	1998, 2000, 2002, 2003, 2006, 2007, 2008, 2009, 2010, 2011, 2012, 2013, 2014, 2015, 2016
A.C. Doukas	7	2001, 2017, 2018, 2021, 2022, 2023, 2026
Α.Ε.Κ. Athens	4	2019, 2020, 2024, 2025
Kosmos Voria Proastia	1	1999

== See also ==
- Hellenic Futsal Cup
