= Naftemporiki =

Greek newspaper

- Type: Daily financial newspaper
- Format: Broadsheet
- Owner(s): Ζοfrank Holdings Co. Ltd. (Dimitris Melissanidis)
- Founder(s): Panos and Giorgos Athanasiadis
- Publisher: Giorgos Melissanidis
- Founded: 1924
- Political alignment: Liberal conservatism
- Headquarters: Akti Kondyli 10, Piraeus, Athens, Greece
- Country: Greece
- Website: naftemporiki.gr

Naftemporiki (Greek: Η Ναυτεμπορική, lit. 'The Shipping Business [Newspaper]') is a Greek daily business journalism newspaper printed in broadsheet that focuses on business and economic current affairs. Naftemporiki was founded in 1924 by brothers Panos and Giorgos Athanasiadis and it is the first financial newspaper in Greece. As of April 7, 2021, the newspaper was acquired through an auction by businessman Dimitris Melissanidis for €7 million euros.

== History ==
Naftemporiki was founded by the Athanasiadis brothers in 1924. It went out of circulation during World War II. It is Greece's most widely read business paper and its website has received several awards.

== Takeover ==
April 7, 2021, Zofrank Holdings Co. owned by Greek businessman Dimitris Melissanidis acquired Naftemporiki for a fee of €7 million.

Second highest bid was media company Alter Ego owned by Evangelos Marinakis, the bid was €3.8 million.

== Naftemporiki TV ==
Naftemporiki TV logo

After the Melissanidis takeover, the Greek businessman launched the namesake television channel for the newspaper. The channel is broadcast on Cosmote TV and Nova platforms and also through the Naftemporiki website.

From September 28, 2025, it has also been broadcasting free-to-air terrestrially, as a regional channel in Attica, replacing New Epsilon TV, which Melissanidis acquired.
