= Mercuria =

Multinational commodity trading company

Mercuria Energy Group Ltd.
- Formerly: J&S Group
- Type: Private
- Industry: Commodity
- Founded: 2004; 22 years ago
- Founders: Marco Dunand (CEO); Daniel Jaeggi (president)
- Headquarters: Geneva, Switzerland
- Number of locations: 37
- Area served: Global
- Products: Raw materials Energy products
- Revenue: US$174 billion (2022)
- Net income: ▼US$2.09 billion (2024)
- Total equity: US$6.6 billion (2024)
- Number of employees: 1,300+ (2025)
- Website: www.mercuria.com

Mercuria Energy Group Ltd. is a Cayman Islands-domiciled Swiss multinational commodity trading company active in a wide spectrum of global energy markets including crude oil and refined petroleum products, natural gas (including LNG), power, biodiesel, base metals and agricultural products. The company is one of the world's five largest independent energy traders and asset operators and is based in Geneva, Switzerland, with 37 additional offices worldwide. The group operates in 50 countries.

Mercuria was founded in 2004 by Marco Dunand and Daniel Jaeggi, then executives at Phibro, a commodities trading firm sold by Citigroup to Occidental Petroleum in 2009. The company focused on oil trading operations until 2007. Prior to this, Mercuria assumed control of J&S Group, named after Polish businessmen Gregory Jankilevitsch and Wiaczesław Smołokowski. They founded Mercuria with several associates, where they remain as shareholders today.

== Operations ==
In 2017, Mercuria moved about 1.5 million barrels per day (240,000 m^{3}/d) of crude and oil products. The firm has upstream and downstream assets that range from oil reserves in Argentina, Canada and the United States to oil terminals in Europe and China. They also maintain a substantial investment in biofuel plants in Germany and the Netherlands.

Its subsidiaries include Navitas Energy in Canada and Vesta Terminal Services in Europe, the latter of which operates port logistics, storage and processing facilities in the Netherlands, Estonia, Belgium, and Germany. Mercuria entered into a joint venture with Sinopec by selling 50% of the terminals in 2013.

Mercuria is an active player in energy and renewable markets through investments in the energy transition, focusing on the United States and Europe. The company told Bloomberg in 2021 that half of its portfolio would be allocated towards renewables within the next five years, and that it had already committed over $2 billion worth of investments into the energy transition.

== History ==
As the company expanded, it has hired traders and investment professionals from Morgan Stanley, Goldman Sachs, Louis Dreyfus Group and Electrabel in London. In November 2010, Mercuria Energy bought MGM International Group from Morgan Stanley Capital Group Inc. and MGM International LLC.

In 2014, Mercuria bought part of JPMorgan's physical commodities trading business for a reported US$3.5 billion. Magid Shenouda, the former co-head of commodities trading at Goldman Sachs Group Inc, joined Mercuria as a shareholder, global head of trading and deputy CEO.

In January 2016, Mercuria announced that ChemChina had bought a 12% stake in the company.

In 2018, Mercuria agreed to acquire 30% of Aegean Marine Petroleum. After Aegean Marine was reorganized, in 2019, Mercuria acquired bankrupt Aegean Marine Petroleum Network Inc and restructured the company to operate as Minerva Bunkering, a physical supplier of marine fuels and a fully owned subsidiary of Mercuria Energy Group Limited.

In 2020, Mercuria earned $786 million with revenues in line with commodity prices to about $85 billion. The company's gross profit on sales for the year was $1.86 billion. In 2022, the company experienced record profits due to volatility in the aftermath of Russia's invasion of Ukraine.

In 2021, Mercuria bought the clean energy specialist Beyond6 from HC2Holdings for $169 million. In November 2022, it was announced Beyond6 has been acquired by the Chevron Corporation subsidiary, Chevron USA Inc. In April 2024, Bloomberg reported that Mercuria Energy Group was preparing to start trading in Japan's physical power market. In June 2024, the company was reportedly seeking to expand in the metals sector.

In July 2026, Mercuria and Italian energy company Eni agreed to establish a 50:50 joint venture to combine parts of their global energy trading operations. Headquartered in Geneva, the venture will cover crude oil, refined products, natural gas, liquefied natural gas (LNG), liquefied petroleum gas (LPG), biofuels and associated logistics activities. The partnership aims to combine Eni's physical energy portfolio with Mercuria's international trading and risk-management capabilities.

In early 2026, Mercuria bought the refinery and Shell gas station chain in Argentina from Brazilian sugar-and-ethanol producer Raizen for 1.2 billion euros.

In October 2026, Mercuria announced the establishment of Sígnar Energy S.A.U. as the new corporate identity for its Argentine downstream operations acquired from Raízen. The company assumed responsibility for operating 892 Shell-branded service stations, the Dock Sud refinery, a lubricants plant, aviation fuel facilities and associated logistics infrastructure. Mercuria retained the Shell brand under a licensing agreement, marking the beginning of a new operating structure for the acquired assets.

== Subsidiaries ==
- Mercuria Commodities Canada Corporation
- Minerva Bunkering
- Mercuria Energy Netherlands B.V.
  - Unico Investments B.V.
- Mercuria Energy Group Holding
- Mercuria Investments US
- Mercuria Energy Asset Management B.V.
- Mercuria (China) Metal Resources Co Ltd
- J.P. Morgan Energy Europe Ltd
- Upstream Capital Partners VI Limited
- AU Energy B.V.
- Mercuria Energy Group Holding SA
- Mercuria UK Llp
