= Cabinet of Alexis Tsipras =

Cabinet of Alexis Tsipras can refer to:

- First Cabinet of Alexis Tsipras, January–August 2015
- Second Cabinet of Alexis Tsipras, September 2015–July 2019
