= Dimitris Melissanidis =

Greek business oil tycoon (born 1951)

31st president of AEK Athens
- In office 17 June 1992 – 15 June 1993
- Preceded by: Kostas Generakis
- Succeeded by: Giannis Karras

33rd president of AEK Athens
- In office 1 June 1994 – 31 May 1995
- Preceded by: Giannis Karras
- Succeeded by: Giannis Karras

Personal details
- Born: 8 March 1951 (age 75) Nikaia, Greece
- Spouse: Tzeni Melissanidis
- Children: Giorgos Melissanidis
- Occupation: Businessman; Shipping & oil tycoon
- Known for: Former owner of AEK Athens F.C. Founder & owner of Aegean Oil; Founder & owner of Aegean Shipping Enterprises; Founder & owner of H.E.C. Owner of Naftemporiki

Dimitris Melissanidis (Greek: Δημήτρης Μελισσανίδης; born 8 March 1951) is a Greek business shipping and oil tycoon, and one of the country's leading businessmen. Melissanidis is in the top ten rich list of Greek entrepreneurs ranking in 6th place. He is most known for his time as owner of Greek football team AEK Athens F.C. and owner of Greek oil company Aegean Oil.

He is the founder and former owner of Aegean Marine Petroleum Network Inc. which is the second strongest and largest independent fuel supplier in the world.

Melissanidis was ranked 98th in 2015 and 97th in 2014 in the world in the Lloyd's List Top 100 Most Influential People in the Shipping Industry for his international shipping contribution.

He was AEK Athens Football Club's 30th and 32nd president, from 1992 to 1993 and 1994 to 1995. He was also president of AEK during 1998–1999 but ENIC Group was the shareholder.

On June 7, 2013, with AEK relegated to the Amateur Division because of financial problems, Melissanidis became again active for the club as an administrator. Later, together with other fans and old players, they created the non-profit association "Union Friends of AEK" (Enosi Filon AEK) which took the majority stake of the football club. During his presidency, AEK's new stadium, Agia Sophia Stadium, was constructed and inaugurated.

== Early life ==
Melissanidis was born in Nikaia, Greece and was raised in Athens. He is the son of a Pontic refugee, Zoras Melissanidis, active in Pontic affairs, and a deeply respected local political figure prior to his forced move to Athens. Melissanidis began as a businessman in 1975 owning a small driving school in Korydallos area.

== Business career ==
=== AMPNI and Aegean Oil ===
Melissanidis was the founder and owner of the marine fuels and bunkering services supplier Aegean Marine Petroleum Network Inc. (AMPNI) and of the petroleum company Aegean Oil which he still currently owns. He launched the business in 1995. In August 2016, Melissanidis sold all the shares of AMPNI.

In 2017 Melissanidis attempted to return to AMPNI, through a proposed acquisition of Hellenic Environmental Center, a company owned by the Melissanidis family, by AMPNI. The reaction of a group of ‘activist’ minority shareholders, led to the cancellation of this deal, changes in AMPNI's board and an internal investigation by the board's audit committee that discovered the misappropriation of up to $300 million in assets. The investigation found that a set of shell companies, fake receipts and documents covered up the misappropriation making it look like Aegean had legitimate contracts with customers that would explain the missing cash. AMPNI filed for Chapter 11 bankruptcy and was acquisitioned by the Mercuria group, and operates as Minerva Bunkering. AMPNI's creditors have filed suits against Melissanidis in courts in the US and Luxemburg accusing Melissanidis of fraudulent activities, of destroying evidence (including the use of military grade deletion software) and of threatening witnesses. Melissanidis has denied these allegations but decision is awaited in regards to these suits.

=== Ionikos ===
His involvement in sports began with Ionikos Nikaias B.C., where he became the club's vice-president in 1984. Later, he became the owner of the Ionikos F.C.. Under his owinership the club was promoted to Alpha Ethniki for the first time in their history in 1989. The following year he stepped down as president and no one was willing to allocate 50 million to convert the club into a football club. Then Nikos Kanellakis appeared and took over the team.

=== AEK Athens Football Club ===
In the summer of 1992, Melissanidis alongside his business partner, Ioannis Karras bought the shares of Andreas Zafiropoulos and became the major shareholders of AEK Athens F.C., with the former becoming the president in 1992–93 and 1994–95 season. During their ownership the club faced great success, winning 2 championships in a row and became the first Greek team to ever compete in the group stage of the UEFA Champions League. In 1998 he became once again the chairman of the club, under the ownership of the ENIC Group, but after the team's elimination from the Champions League qualifiers in 1999, he left the club.

On 7 June 2013, Melissanidis became again active for AEK, after they declared bankruptcy, in order to save the club and bring them back to success. The company declared bankruptcy and were relegated to Greece's third tier. The club was reported to owe €170 million ($219 million) in taxes and started the 2013–14 campaign in the Football League 2, the country's third amateur division. Later, together with other notable AEK fans and old players, they created the non-profit association "Union Friends of AEK" (Enosi Filon AEK) which took the majority stake of the football club.

Since the arrival and return of Melissandis to the club, AEK secured major sponsorship deals which gave them a huge financial boost. Melissanidis secured a €2.1 million sponsorship deal from OPAP, a €1.5 million contract with Greek Telecommunications company Nova Sports and a €1 million sponsorship deal with Fujitsu.

Melissanidis has unveiled plans also for a new stadium in Nea Filadelfia, where the old stadium of AEK was placed.

On 2 October 2013, the board of AEK Athens, under Dimitris Melissanidis, presented plans for the new stadium to the municipality of Nea Filadelfeia, in order to gain permission to build. A new 4-star UEFA system stadium will be built, seating between 32,500 and 35,000 spectators. The cost of this project is estimated to be around €70-80 million. It is modelled after the Agia Sophia church in Constantinople, as AEK has its roots there. Around 1,500-2,000 new jobs will become available and the neighbourhood is expected to benefit largely from this endeavour. The structural design of the stadium was designed by Italian architect Massimo Majowiecki and the architectural design by the Greek architect Athanasius Kyratsous. Majowiecki is most known for designing the home ground of the Juventus Stadium.

In July 2024, he left the presidency of AEK, handing over its leadership and his package of shares to the shipowner Marios Iliopoulos, owner of Seajet, who bought the company's shares for 90 million euros.

=== Emma Delta & OPAP ===
Melissanidis, via his own company Geonama Holdings, reported owned a stake in Emma Delta, a private equity fund of EMMA Capital. Emma Delta acquired 33% stake of Greek betting firm OPAP for €652 million. According to Reuters, OPAP was the European biggest betting firm, as of 2008. Dimitris Melissanidis is a major shareholder in OPAP and is the largest investor, investing €157 million in the takeover.

At the signing, Dimitris Melissanidis ended his statement by commenting that "OPAP is turning a page".

On 18 February 2022 it was announced that the Melissanidis family had sold its entire stake in OPAP to Allwyn, owned by Czech billionaire Karel Komarek, for a price of EUR 327.4 million. This development is not unrelated to the lawsuits that Mr. Dimitris Melissanidis, his son George Melissanidis and their companies are facing in connection with Aegean Marine Petroleum Network, especially since Allwyn has announced its plans to publicly list on the New York Stock Exchange (NYSE), working in partnership with special purpose acquisition company Cohn Robbins Holdings Corp. (CRHC).

== Other ==
Melissanidis has social and philanthropic action, mainly in cooperation with the Church of Greece and the Ecumenical Patriarchate of Constantinople. In January 2014, he was honoured with the title of Kouropalates (cura palatii) by the Ecumenical Patriarch of Constantinople, a title given for the first time since the 15th century.

== Controversy ==
In 1996, Melissanidis and his business partner, Ioannis Karras, were sentenced to a prison sentence for oil smuggling, however the charges were dropped and he was found not guilty of oil smuggling.

During the time of negotiations with OPAP, Kostas Louropoulos, OPAP's chief executive, felt put under pressure by Melissanidis in a series of telephone calls. "He insulted me, as on many previous occasions. . . You dare to sign [the Intralot and lottery contracts] and I will take your head off", Louropoulos quoted Melissanidis as telling him on May 20, 2013”, according to the Financial Times. Also, immediately after the signing of the OPAP deal, the Greek privatization agency chairman, Stelios Stavridis, was dismissed by Greek Finance Minister, Yannis Stournaras, “for ethical reasons”, when news reports emerged that he travelled on Dimitris Melissanidis’ private jet.

Furthermore, in a highly publicized incident, discussed in the Greek Parliament, calling from an ‘Aegean Oil’ listed telephone number, Melissanidis personally bullied with death threats to Lefteris Charalambopoulos, the Greek reporter (who also related with Evangelos Marinakis rival businessman with Melissanidis) who published the government report in the left-wing ‘Unfollow’ magazine. The caller self-identified as Dimitris Melissanidis threatened the reporters life repeatedly. Part of what was said by the man self-identified as Dimitris Melissanidis, which was taken down by the reporter, follows: “I could have you killed without having warned you. But I am a man and I’m gonna have you blown up in your sleep. I’ll have you killed, you, your wife, your children, everything you’ve got”.

Furthermore, after Melissanidis assumed OPAP's management, AEK Athens F.C. received a €2.1 million sponsorship deal. Protesting about “unfair competition” due to Melissanidis’ management of both AEK and OPAP, some Greek football teams pulled out of their OPAP sponsorship contracts. Olympiacos pulled out of their €1.9 million sponsorship deal with OPAP.

In 2014, he was found guilty of oil smuggling, with his partner Ioannis Karras, for the period 1993–1995. The punishment was redeemable for €20 a day.
