= Athina 90 =

Greek futsal club

- Founded: 1990; 35 years ago
- Ground: Dekeleias 6, Kifisia; Athens, Greece
- Owner: Theodoros Ntarlas
- Coach: Apostolis Beltsidis
- League: Futsal Super League
- Website: https://www.facebook.com/profile.php?id=61562233023685&locale=el_GR leftarm1=279D5A
Home colours	Away colours

Athina 90 is a futsal club based in Kifisia, Greece. Ιt was the first futsal club established in Greece and has won more trophies than any other team in Greek futsal, including a record 15 League titles and a record 7 Cups. The club has also participated in UEFA Futsal Champions League 14 times.

== Colours and crest ==
Athina 90's colours were green, white and blue and its logo depicts a teenager playing with a ball.

== Last squad roster ==
Note: Flags indicate national team as defined under FIFA eligibility rules; some limited exceptions apply. Players may hold more than one non-FIFA nationality.

No.	Pos.	Nation	Player
1	G	(Greece) GRE	Panagiotis Beltsidis
2	G	(Greece) GRE	Panagiotis Bardis
3	G	(Greece) GRE	
4	G	(Greece) GRE	Giannis Beltsidis
5	G	(Portugal) POR	Claudio Rodrigues
6	G	(Greece) GRE	Giorgos Palamidas
7	G	(Greece) GRE	Dimitrios Ntarlas
8	G	(Greece) GRE	Nikos Magklaras

No.	Pos.	Nation	Player
9	G	(Greece) GRE	Giannis Kalkos
10	G	(Greece) GRE	Panagiotis Paouris
11	G	(Greece) GRE	Anastasios Ziakas
12	G	(Greece) GRE	Stratis Papaefstratiou
13	G	(Greece) GRE	Kostas Stylianopoulos
14	G	(Greece) GRE	Dimitrios Spanoudakis
15	G	(Greece) GRE	Panagiotis Merkouris
16	G	(Greece) GRE	Giorgos Oikonomopoulos
17	G	(Greece) GRE	Pantelis Filippatos
18	G	(Greece) GRE	Panagiotis Mourtzoukos
19	G	(Greece) GRE	Orestis Stylianopoulos

== Honours ==
Season	Division	Place	Greek Cup
1997/98	Premier League	1st	
1998/99	Premier League	2nd	
1999/00	Premier League	1st	
2000/01	Premier League	2nd	
2001/02	Premier League	1st	Winners
2002/03	Premier League	1st	
2003/04	Premier League	–	
2004/05	Premier League	–	
2005/06	Premier League	1st	
2006/07	Premier League	1st	Winners
2007/08	Premier League	1st	
2008/09	Premier League	1st	
2009/10	Premier League	1st	Winners
2010/11	Premier League	1st	Winners
2011/12	Premier League	1st	Winners
2012/13	Premier League	1st	Winners
2013/14	Premier League	1st	
2014/15	Premier League	1st	
2015/16	Premier League	1st	
2016/17	Premier League	2nd	Winners

- 15 Leagues: 1998, 2000, 2002, 2003, 2006, 2007, 2008, 2009, 2010, 2011, 2012, 2013, 2014,2015, 2016
- 7 Cups: 2002, 2007, 2010, 2011, 2012, 2013, 2017
- 1 Super Cup: 2014

== UEFA Futsal Cup ==
Record	Date	Game	Player	Age
Youngest player in the history of UEFA Futsal Cup participating in a game	03/10/2010	(Greece) Athina 90 3-9 Time Lviv	(Greece) Panagiotis Paouris	13 years 9 months and 17 days
Youngest player in the history of UEFA Futsal Cup scoring a goal	03/10/2010	(Greece) Athina 90 3-9 Time Lviv	(Greece) Panagiotis Paouris	13 years 9 months and 17 days

Personal Record	Date	Game
Biggest win	01/10/2009	Athina 90 11-2 Skövde AIK
Biggest Defeat	16/10/2003	S.L. Benfica (futsal) 12-0 Athina 90

Other Personal Records
Appearances in UEFA Futsal Cup	14
Player with most UEFA Futsal Cup appearances	(Greece) 36 Ilias Bousmpouras
Player with most UEFA Futsal Cup goals	(Greece) 20 Ilias Bousmpouras
