= 2009–10 UEFA Futsal Cup =

Tournament details
- Dates: 30 August 2009 – 25 April 2010
- Teams: 16 (Elite Round); 48 (Total)

Final positions
- Champions: (Portugal) Benfica (1st title)
- Runners-up: (Spain) Interviú

Tournament statistics
- Top scorer: (Portugal) Joel Queirós

The 2009–10 UEFA Futsal Cup was the 24th edition of Europe's premier club futsal tournament and the 9th edition under the current UEFA Futsal Cup format.

== Teams ==
Elite round
(Kazakhstan) AFC Kairat	(Russia) Viz-Sinara Ekaterinburg	(Spain) Interviú^{TH}	(Spain) ElPozo Murcia
Main round
(Azerbaijan) Araz Naxçivan	(Belgium) Action 21 Charleroi	(Belarus) Viten Novolukoml	(Croatia) MNK Potpićan '98
(Greece) Athina 90	(Georgia (country)) Iberia 2003 Tbilisi	(Italy) Luparense	(Netherlands) FC Marlène
(Poland) Hurtap Łęczyca	(Portugal) Benfica	(Czech Republic) Era-Pack Chrudim	(Romania) Cip Deva
(Serbia) Kolubara Lazarevac	(Slovenia) KMN Puntar	(Sweden) Skövde AIK	(Ukraine) Taim Lviv
(Hungary) MVFC Berettyóújfalu			
Preliminary round
(Albania) KF Tirana	(Andorra) Futbol Club Madriu	(Armenia) Erebuni Futsal	(Austria) Murexin All Stars
(Bosnia and Herzegovina) KMF Leotar Trebinje	(Bulgaria) MFC Varna	(Cyprus) Omonia Nicosia	(Denmark) Futsal BGA
(Estonia) Sillamäe JK	(Finland) Golden FT Espoo	(France) Roubaix Futsal	(Germany) Futsal Panthers Köln
(England) Helvecia Futsal	(Republic of Ireland) Cork City FC	(Iceland) Hvöt Blönduós	(Israel) ASA Tel-Aviv
(Latvia) Nikars Riga	(Lithuania) Nautara Kaunas	(North Macedonia) Železarec Skopje	(Malta) White Eagles FC
(Moldova) Tornado Chişinău	Montenegro Stars Budva	(Norway) Nidaros Futsal	(Scotland) Fair City Santos
(Slovakia) RCS Košice	(Switzerland) FC Seefeld Zurich	(Turkey) Gazi University	

th Title Holder

== Preliminary round ==
=== Group A ===
Team	Pts	Pld	W	D	L	GF	GA
(Moldova) Tornado Chişinău	9	3	3	0	0	18	4
(Bulgaria) MFC Varna	6	3	2	0	1	16	9
(Turkey) Gazi University	3	3	1	0	2	8	11
(Republic of Ireland) Cork City FC	0	3	0	0	3	5	23

August 20, 2009	Tornado	4–1	Gazi U.	Vladislav, Varna (Bulgaria)
17:30		report

August 20, 2009	Varna	8–3	Cork City	Vladislav, Varna (Bulgaria)
19:30

August 21, 2009	Cork City	0–10	Tornado	Vladislav, Varna (Bulgaria)
17:30

August 21, 2009	Varna	5–2	Gazi U.	Vladislav, Varna (Bulgaria)
19:30

August 23, 2009	Gazi U.	5–2	Cork City	Vladislav, Varna (Bulgaria)
17:30

August 23, 2009	Tornado	4–3	Varna	Vladislav, Varna (Bulgaria)
19:30

=== Group B ===
Team	Pts	Pld	W	D	L	GF	GA
(Cyprus) Omonia	9	3	3	0	0	20	9
(Slovakia) RCS Košice	4	3	1	1	1	8	9
(Norway) Nidaros Futsal	3	3	1	0	2	8	10
(Switzerland) FC Seefeld Zürich	1	3	0	1	2	6	14

Tassos Papadoulos, Nicosia (Cyprus)

Košice	4–2	Nidaros	17:00, August 17, 2009
Omonia	10–3	Seefeld	19:15, August 17, 2009
Seefeld	2–2	Košice	17:00, August 18, 2009
Omonia	5–4	Nidaros	19:15, August 18, 2009
Košice	2–5	Omonia	17:00, August 20, 2009
Nidaros	2–1	Seefeld	19:15, August 20, 2009

=== Group C ===
Team	Pts	Pld	W	D	L	GF	GA
(Latvia) FK Nikars Riga	9	3	3	0	0	22	12
(Bosnia and Herzegovina) KMF Leotar Trebinje	6	3	2	0	1	22	9
(Germany) Futsal Panthers Köln	3	3	1	0	2	9	15
(Estonia) Sillamäe JK	0	3	0	0	3	6	23

Bregovi, Trebinje (Bosnia and Herzegovina)

Leotar	6–0	P. Köln	19:00, August 17, 2009
Nikars	6–4	Sillamäe	21:00, August 17, 2009
P. Köln	3–7	Nikars	19:00, August 18, 2009
Leotar	11–0	Sillamäe	21:00, August 18, 2009
Sillamäe	2–6	P. Köln	19:00, August 20, 2009
Nikars	9–5	Leotar	21:00, August 20, 2009

=== Group D ===
Team	Pts	Pld	W	D	L	GF	GA
(Finland) Golden Futsal Team	9	3	3	0	0	19	7
(England) Helvecia Futsal	6	3	2	0	1	21	12
(France) Roubaix Futsal	3	3	1	0	2	9	13
(Scotland) Fair City Santos	0	3	0	0	3	4	21

Tapiola Urheiluhalli, Espoo (Finland)

Golden F.T.	6–2	Santos	16:30, August 20, 2009
Roubaix	4–6	Helvecia	18:45, August 20, 2009
Golden F.T.	6–4	Helvecia	13:00, August 22, 2009
Santos	0–4	Roubaix	15:15, August 22, 2009
Helvecia	11–2	Santos	13:45, August 23, 2009
Roubaix	1–7	Golden F.T.	16:00, August 23, 2009

=== Group E ===
Team	Pts	Pld	W	D	L	GF	GA
(Lithuania) Nautara Kaunas	9	3	3	0	0	17	11
(Albania) KF Tirana	6	3	2	0	1	11	9
(Malta) White Eagles FC	1	3	0	1	2	11	14
(Andorra) Futbol Club Madriu	1	3	0	1	2	4	9

S.Darius & S.Girenas Sport Center, Kaunas (Lithuania)

Tirana	4–3	W. Eagles	16:45, August 19, 2009
Nautara	4–1	Madriu	19:00, August 19, 2009
Madriu	2–4	Tirana	16:45, August 20, 2009
Nautara	9–7	W. Eagles	19:00, August 20, 2009
W. Eagles	1–1	Madriu	13:00, August 22, 2009
Tirana	3–4	Nautara	15:15, August 22, 2009

=== Group F ===
Team	Pts	Pld	W	D	L	GF	GA
(Armenia) Erebuni Futsal	7	3	2	1	0	13	5
(Israel) ASA Tel-Aviv	7	3	2	1	0	14	8
(Austria) Allstars W. Neustadt	3	3	1	0	2	10	13
(Iceland) Hvöt	0	3	0	0	3	6	17

SHS Wr. Neustadt Dr. Fred Sinowatz Schule, Wiener Neustadt (Austria)

Asa Tel-Aviv	5–2	Hvöt	18:00, August 19, 2009
Allstars	2–3	Erebuni	20:30, August 19, 2009
Erebuni	3–3	Asa Tel-Aviv	18:00, August 20, 2009
Allstars	5–4	Hvöt	20:30, August 20, 2009
Hvöt	0–7	Erebuni	18:00, August 22, 2009
Asa Tel-Aviv	6–3	Allstars	20:30, August 22, 2009

=== Group G ===
Team	Pts	Pld	W	D	L	GF	GA
Montenegro Stars Budva	3	2	1	0	1	10	6
(North Macedonia) KMF Železarec Skopje	3	2	1	0	1	6	7
(Denmark) Futsal BGA	3	2	1	0	1	8	11

Sport Halle Kale, Skopje (North Macedonia)

Železarec	3–5	Futsal BGA	20:30, August 21, 2009
Futsal BGA	3–8	Budva	18:30, August 22, 2009
Budva	2–3	Železarec	20:30, August 23, 2009

== Main Round ==
=== Group 1 ===
Team	Pld	W	D	L	GF	GA	Pts
(Italy) Luparense	3	2	1	0	23	3	7
(Ukraine) Time Lviv	3	2	1	0	20	4	7
(Hungary) Berettyóújfalu	3	1	0	2	4	18	3
(Moldova) Tornado	3	0	0	3	3	25	0

Fönix Arena, Debrecen (Hungary)

Luparense	10–0	Tornado	October 1, 2009
Berettyóújfalu	0–6	Time Lviv	October 1, 2009
Time Lviv	3–3	Luparense	October 2, 2009
Berettyóújfalu	4–2	Tornado	October 2, 2009
Tornado	1–11	Time	October 4, 2009
Luparense	10–0	Berettyóújfalu	October 4, 2009

=== Group 2 ===
Team	Pld	W	D	L	GF	GA	Pts
(Czech Republic) Era-Pack Chrudim	3	3	0	0	23	5	9
(Latvia) Nikars Riga	3	2	0	1	8	15	6
(Poland) Hurtap Łęczyca	3	1	0	2	15	10	3
(Lithuania) Nautara Kaunas	3	0	0	3	4	20	0

Zimní Stadión, Chrudim (Czech Republic)

Łęczyca	9–1	Nautara	September 28, 2009
Chrudim	10–1	Nikars	September 28, 2009
Nikars	4–3	Łęczyca	September 29, 2009
Chrudim	8–1	Nautara	September 29, 2009
Nautara	2–3	Nikars	October 1, 2009
Łęczyca	3–5	Chrudim	October 1, 2009

=== Group 3 ===
Team	Pld	W	D	L	GF	GA	Pts
(Belgium) Action 21 Charleroi	3	3	0	0	17	3	9
(Greece) Athina 90	3	1	1	1	16	9	4
(Finland) Golden Futsal Team	3	1	1	1	12	9	4
(Sweden) Skövde AIK	3	0	0	3	6	30	0

La Garenne, Charleroi (Belgium)

Skövde	3–9	Golden F.T.	September 30, 2009
Charleroi	4–2	Athina	September 30, 2009
Athina	11–2	Skövde	October 1, 2009
Charleroi	3–0	Golden Futsal Team	October 1, 2009
Golden Futsal Team	3–3	Athina	October 3, 2009
Skövde	1–10	Charleroi	October 3, 2009

=== Group 4 ===
Team	Pld	W	D	L	GF	GA	Pts
(Portugal) Benfica	3	3	0	0	26	4	9
(Slovenia) KMN Puntar	3	2	0	1	12	4	6
(Belarus) Viten Orsha	3	1	0	2	3	11	3
Montenegro Stars Budva	3	0	0	3	2	24	0

Solski Center, Tolmin (Slovenia)

Benfica	15–1	Budva	October 1, 2009
Puntar	3–0	Viten Orsha	October 1, 2009
Viten Orsha	1–7	Benfica	October 2, 2009
Puntar	7–0	Budva	October 2, 2009
Budva	1–2	Viten Orsha	October 4, 2009
Benfica	4–2	Puntar	October 4, 2009

=== Group 5 ===
Team	Pld	W	D	L	GF	GA	Pts
(Azerbaijan) Araz Naxçivan	3	2	1	0	12	5	7
(Croatia) MNK Potpićan 98	3	1	2	0	11	10	5
(Serbia) Kolubara Lazarevac	3	1	0	2	10	11	3
(Cyprus) Omonia	3	0	1	2	7	14	1

Dom Sportova "Mate Parlov", Pula (Croatia)

Araz	4–1	Omonia	October 1, 2009
Potpićan	4–3	Kolubara	October 1, 2009
Kolubara	0–4	Araz	October 2, 2009
Potpićan	3–3	Omonia	October 2, 2009
Omonia	3–7	Kolubara	October 4, 2009
Araz	4–4	Potpićan	October 4, 2009

=== Group 6 ===
Team	Pld	W	D	L	GF	GA	Pts
(Netherlands) FC Marlène	3	2	0	1	12	2	6
(Georgia (country)) Iberia 2003 Tbilisi	3	2	0	1	10	5	6
(Romania) CIP Deva	3	2	0	1	14	7	6
(Armenia) Erebuni Futsal	3	0	0	3	1	23	0

Sports Hall, Deva (Romania)

Iberia	5–0	Erebuni	October 1, 2009
Deva	0–3	Marlène	October 1, 2009
Marlène	0–2	Iberia	October 2, 2009
Deva	9–1	Erebuni	October 2, 2009
Erebuni	0–9	Marlène	October 4, 2009
Iberia	3–5	Deva	October 4, 2009

== Elite Round ==
=== Group 1 ===
Team	Pts	Pld	W	D	L	GF	GA
(Italy) Luparense	9	3	3	0	0	15	5
(Spain) ElPozo Murcia	6	3	2	0	1	25	7
(Georgia (country)) Iberia 2003 Tbilisi	3	3	1	0	2	5	19
(Belgium) Action 21 Charleroi	0	3	0	0	3	5	19

November 19, 2009	ElPozo Murcia	12–0	Iberia	Zoppas Arena, Conegliano (TV) (Italy)
	Vinicius 2', 17', 22'; Mauricio 11'; Wilde 16'; Esquerdinha 8' 37'; Ciço 21'; Saúl 26', 28'; Alex 35'; Barroso 38'	Report

November 19, 2009	Luparense	6–0	Charleroi	Zoppas Arena, Conegliano (TV) (Italy)
	Nuno; Honorio; Danieli; Barro; Vasconcelos	Report

November 20, 2009	Charleroi	2–9	ElPozo Murcia	Zoppas Arena, Conegliano (TV) (Italy)
		Report

November 20, 2009	Luparense	4–1	Iberia	Zoppas Arena, Conegliano (TV) (Italy)
		Report

November 22, 2009	Iberia	4–3	Charleroi	Zoppas Arena, Conegliano (TV) (Italy)
		Report

November 22, 2009	ElPozo Murcia	4–5	Luparense	Zoppas Arena, Conegliano (TV) (Italy)
20:45 (CET)	Kike 30'; Wilde 32', 33'; Vinicius 39'	Report	Danieli 25'; Muñoz Calvo 30'; Barro 33', 36'; Vampeta 37'	Referee: Karel Henych (CZE)

=== Group 2 ===
Team	Pts	Pld	W	D	L	GF	GA
(Portugal) Benfica	7	3	2	1	0	14	3
(Russia) Viz-Sinara Ekaterinburg	7	3	2	1	0	13	2
(Croatia) MNK Potpićan '98	3	3	1	0	2	3	11
(Netherlands) FC Marlène	0	3	0	0	3	1	15

November 19, 2009	Ekaterinburg	2–0	Potpićan	Indoor Pavilhão do SL Benfica, Lisbon (Portugal)
17:00 (CET)	Prudnikov 31' 21"; Chistopolov 32' 06"	Report		Referee: Massimo Cumbo (ITA)

November 19, 2009	Benfica	4–0	Marlène	Indoor Pavilhão do SL Benfica, Lisbon (Portugal)
21:30 (CET)	Pedro Costa 15' 33"; Arnaldo Pereira 15' 45"; César Paulo 16' 56"; Zé Maria 18' 58"	Report		Referee: Ligienza (POL)

November 20, 2009	Marlène	0–9	Ekaterinburg	Indoor Pavilhão do SL Benfica, Lisbon (Portugal)
17:00 (CET)		Report	Agapov 00' 52", 02' 08"; Prudnikov 06' 08"; Timoschenkov 06' 43", 20' 41"; De Zwart (o.g.) 11' 36"; Mokhov 28' 54"; Abramov 31' 29", 37' 38"	Referee: Petros Panayides (CYP)

November 20, 2009	Benfica	8–1	Potpićan	Indoor Pavilhão do SL Benfica, Lisbon (Portugal)
21:00 (CET)	Pedro Costa 07' 49", 18' 12"; Joel Queirós 08' 32", 24' 44"; Ricardinho 24' 39"; Davi 28' 47"; Arnaldo Pereira 29' 02"; Marinho 31' 01"	Report	P. Drndić 04' 43"	Referee: Gabor Kovacs (HUN)

November 22, 2009	Potpićan	2–1	Marlène	Indoor Pavilhão do SL Benfica, Lisbon (Portugal)
15:30 (CET)	D. Novoselac 09' 35"; Radusin 30' 41"	Report	Thies 30' 28"	Referee: Jacek Ligienza (POL)

November 22, 2009	Ekaterinburg	2–2	Benfica	Indoor Pavilhão do SL Benfica, Lisbon (Portugal)
18:00 (CET)	Timoschenkov 30' 38"; Khamadiev 32' 13"	Report	Joel Queirós 18' 06"; César Paulo 24' 05"	Referee: Gabor Kovacs (HUN)

=== Group 3 ===
Team	Pts	Pld	W	D	L	GF	GA
(Spain) Interviú	9	3	3	0	0	11	2
(Ukraine) Time Lviv	6	3	2	0	1	10	5
(Czech Republic) Era-Pack Chrudim	3	3	1	0	2	7	12
(Slovenia) KMN Puntar	0	3	0	0	3	3	12

November 19, 2009	Interviú	3–0	Puntar	ČEZ Aréna, Pardubice (Czech Republic)
15:30 (CET)	Daniel 2'; Gabriel 4'; Borja 31'	Report

November 19, 2009	Chrudim	2–4	Time Lviv	ČEZ Aréna, Pardubice (Czech Republic)
18:00 (CET)	Kopecký 5'; Max 27'	Report	Legchanov 7' 8'; Kondratyuk 8'; Bondar 39'

November 20, 2009	Time Lviv	1–3	Interviú	ČEZ Aréna, Pardubice (Czech Republic)
15:30 (CET)	Kondratyuk 19'	Report	Gabriel 5'; Schumacher 6'; Borja 32'

November 20, 2009	Chrudim	4–3	Puntar	ČEZ Aréna, Pardubice (Czech Republic)
18:00 (CET)	Rešetár 3'; Kopecký 25'; Mikan 36'; Max 39'	Report	Uršič 15'; Rutar 31'; Brkić 37'

November 22, 2009	Puntar	0–5	Time Lviv	ČEZ Aréna, Pardubice (Czech Republic)
11:00 (CET)		Report	Brkić 2' (o.g.); Pavlenko 6' 31'; Moskvin 35'; Cheporniuk 38'

November 22, 2009	Interviú	5–1	Chrudim	ČEZ Aréna, Pardubice (Czech Republic)
13:30 (CET)	Gabriel 1'; Šluka 6' (o.g.); Schumacher 20'; Neto 23'; Torras 39'	Report	Mikan 39'

=== Group 4 ===
Team	Pts	Pld	W	D	L	GF	GA
(Azerbaijan) Araz Naxçivan	9	3	3	0	0	18	4
(Kazakhstan) AFC Kairat	6	3	2	0	1	9	8
(Greece) Athina 90	3	3	1	0	2	5	10
(Latvia) Nikars Riga	0	3	0	0	3	3	13

November 19, 2009	Kairat	3–2	Athina	Palace of Sport, Baku (Azerbaijan)
15:30 (CET)	Leo 18' 27'; Guga 27'	Report	Bousmpouras 01'; Artinos 19'	Attendance: 500

November 19, 2009	Araz	7–1	Nikars	Palace of Sport, Baku (Azerbaijan)
18:00 (CET)		Report		Attendance: 1800

November 20, 2009	Nikars	2–3	Kairat	Palace of Sport, Baku (Azerbaijan)
15:30 (CET)		Report		Attendance: 350

November 20, 2009	Araz	7–0	Athina	Palace of Sport, Baku (Azerbaijan)
18:00 (CET)		Report		Attendance: 1900

November 22, 2009	Athina	3–0	Nikars	Palace of Sport, Baku (Azerbaijan)
13:00 (CET)		Report		Attendance: 300

November 22, 2009	Kairat	3–4	Araz	Palace of Sport, Baku (Azerbaijan)
15:30 (CET)	Tigrinho 14'; Katata 19'; Guga 19'	Report	Thiago 03' 16'; Borisov 08'; Santos 30'	Attendance: 3000

== Final four ==
Semi-finals
23 April – Lisbon
(Azerbaijan) Araz Naxçivan	2
(Spain) Interviú	5
23 April – Lisbon
(Portugal) Benfica	8
(Italy) Luparense	4

Final
25 April – Lisbon
(Spain) Interviú	2
(Portugal) Benfica (a.e.t.)	3
Third place
25 April – Lisbon
(Azerbaijan) Araz Naxçivan (p)	2(5)
(Italy) Luparense	2(4)

=== Semifinals ===
April 23, 2010	Araz Naxçivan	2–5	Interviú	Pavilhão Atlântico, Lisbon
19:00 CET	Biro Jade 17'; Serjão 22'	Report	Torras 9'; Gabriel 22'; Betão 33'; L. Amado 37'; Daniel 39'

April 23, 2010	Benfica	8–4	Luparense	Pavilhão Atlântico, Lisbon
	Joel Queirós 3', 12'; Ricardinho 4', 35'; Arnaldo 20', 36'; Davi 22'; César Paulo 38'	Report	Honorio 3'; Vampeta 13'; Baptistella 35'; Zé Maria 38' (o.g.)

=== Third place play-off ===
April 25, 2010	Araz Naxçivan	2–2 (5–4 p)	Luparense	Pavilhão Atlântico, Lisbon
	Borisov 3'; Thiago 36'	Report	Calvo 6'; Baptistella 17'

=== Final ===
April 25, 2010	Benfica	3–2 (a.e.t.)	Interviú	Pavilhão Atlântico, Lisbon
18:30	Joel Queirós 11'; Arnaldo 21'; Davi 42'	Report	Marquinhos 7'; Betão 24'	Attendance: 9400

UEFA Futsal Cup
2009–10 Winners

Benfica
1st Title

== Top goalscorers ==
Scorer	Nation	Goals
Joel Queirós	Benfica	12
Baranovs	Nikars Riga	11
Vampeta	Luparense	11
