= 2005–06 UEFA Futsal Cup =

Final positions
- Champions: (Spain) Interviú
- Runners-up: (Russia) Dinamo Moskva

The 2005–06 UEFA Futsal Cup was the 20th edition of Europe's premier club futsal tournament and the 5th edition under the current UEFA Futsal Cup format.

== Preliminary round ==
Team	Pld	W	D	L	GF	GA	Pts
(Armenia) FC Talgrig Yerevan	3	2	0	1	13	8	6
(Albania) Dinamo Tirana	3	2	0	1	11	7	6
(England) Futsal Club White Bear	3	2	0	1	9	3	6
(France) Roubaix Futsal	3	0	0	3	3	18	0

Dinamo Tirana	2–1	White Bear
Talgrig Yereven	7–2	Roubaix
White Bear	6–0	Roubaix
Talgrig Yereven	5–4	Dinamo Tirana
Roubaix	1–5	Dinamo Tirana
White Bear	2–1	Talgrig Yereven

== First qualifying round ==
=== Group 1 ===
Team	Pts	Pld	W	D	L	GF	GA
(Kazakhstan) Kairat Almaty	9	3	3	0	0	18	4
(Latvia) Raba Riga	6	3	2	0	1	8	10
(Belarus) Dorozhnik Minsk	3	3	1	0	2	7	10
(Romania) ACS Odorheiu Secuiesc	0	3	0	0	3	8	17

Riga	1–6	Kairat
Minsk	5–3	Odorheiu
Kairat	4–1	Minsk
Riga	4–3	Odorheiu
Odorheiu	2–8	Kairat
Minsk	1–3	Minsk

=== Group 2 ===
Team	Pts	Pld	W	D	L	GF	GA
(Russia) MFK Dinamo Moskva	9	3	3	0	0	26	2
(Bulgaria) MFC Varna	4	3	1	1	1	11	11
(Czech Republic) Era-Pack Chrudim	4	3	1	1	1	7	11
(Andorra) FS Cap del Carrer	0	3	0	0	3	2	22

Dinamo	6–2	Varna
Chrudim	3–1	Cap del Carrer
Cap del Carrer	0–14	Dinamo
Chrudim	4–4	Varna
Varna	5–1	Cap del Carrer
Dinamo	6–0	Chrudim

=== Group 3 ===
Team	Pts	Pld	W	D	L	GF	GA
(Portugal) Benfica	9	3	3	0	0	16	2
(Hungary) Aramis Futsal Club	4	3	1	1	1	10	13
(Armenia) FC Talgrig Yerevan	2	3	0	2	1	9	10
(Cyprus) Ararat Nicosia	1	3	0	1	2	6	16

Benfica	3–2	Talgrig Yerevan
Aramis	7–2	Ararat
Ararat	0–5	Benfica
Aramis	3–3	Talgrig Yerevan
Talgrig Yerevan	4–4	Ararat
Benfica	8–0	Aramis

=== Group 4 ===
Team	Pts	Pld	W	D	L	GF	GA
(Serbia and Montenegro) KMF Marbo Beograd	9	3	3	0	0	23	5
(Greece) Athina 90	6	3	2	0	1	13	15
(Slovenia) Lesna Litija	3	3	1	0	2	14	13
(Albania) Dinamo Tirana	0	3	0	0	3	6	23

Beograd	10–0	Tirana
Litija	3–6	Athina
Athina	1–8	Beograd
Litija	7–2	Tirana
Tirana	4–6	Athina
Beograd	5–4	Litija

=== Group 5 ===
Team	Pts	Pld	W	D	L	GF	GA
(Belgium) PB Morlanwelz	7	3	2	1	0	9	7
(Bosnia and Herzegovina) Karaka Mostar	6	3	2	0	1	10	6
(Azerbaijan) Araz Naxçivan	4	3	1	1	1	9	8
(Netherlands) FCK De Hommel	0	3	0	0	3	6	13

Morlanwelz	10–0	Naxçivan
Mostar	3–6	De Hommel
De Hommel	1–8	Morlanwelz
Mostar	7–2	Naxçivan
Naxçivan	4–6	De Hommel
Morlanwelz	5–4	Mostar

=== Group 6 ===
Team	Pts	Pld	W	D	L	GF	GA
(Belgium) Action 21 Charleroi	9	3	3	0	0	18	6
(Poland) Clearex Chorzów	6	3	2	0	1	11	4
(Georgia (country)) Iberia Tbilisi	3	3	1	0	2	7	16
(Lithuania) Nautara Kaunas	0	3	0	0	3	7	17

Chorzów	4–1	Tbilisi
Charleroi	7–3	Kaunas
Chorzów	5–0	Kaunas
Tbilisi	1–8	Charleroi
Kaunas	4–5	Tbilisi
Charleroi	3–2	Chorzów

=== Group 7 ===
Team	Pts	Pld	W	D	L	GF	GA
(Spain) Boomerang Interviú	6	2	2	0	0	9	0
(Italy) Perugia Calcio a 5	3	2	1	0	1	11	4
(North Macedonia) KMF Alfa Parf Skopje	0	2	0	0	2	1	17
(Moldova) Camelot Chişinău	-	–	–	–	–	–	–

Interviu	6–0	Skopje
Perugia	11–1	Skopje
Interviu	3–0	Perugia

=== Group 8 ===
Team	Pts	Pld	W	D	L	GF	GA
(Ukraine) Shakhtar Donetsk	9	3	3	0	0	19	3
(Croatia) MNK Orkan Zagreb	4	3	1	1	1	11	7
(Slovakia) Slov-Matic Bratislava	4	3	1	1	1	8	9
(Finland) Ilves FS	0	3	0	0	3	4	23

Shakhtar	5–2	Bratislava
Orkan	8–2	Ilves
Ilves	0–11	Shakhtar
Orkan	2–2	Bratislava
Shakhtar	4–2	Ilves
Charleroi	3–1	Orkan

== Second qualifying round ==
=== Group A ===
Team	Pld	W	D	L	GF	GA	Pts
(Spain) Boomerang Interviú	3	3	0	0	20	4	9
(Kazakhstan) Kairat Almaty	3	1	1	1	10	9	4
(Portugal) Benfica	3	0	2	1	6	8	2
(Belgium) PB Morlanwelz	3	0	1	2	2	17	1

Benfica	3–3	Kairat
Morlanwelz	0–11	Interviú
Interviú	5–3	Kairat
Benfica	1–1	Morlanwelz
Kairat	5–1	Morlanwelz
Interviú	4–2	Benfica

=== Group B ===
Team	Pld	W	D	L	GF	GA	Pts
(Russia) Dinamo Moskva	3	2	1	0	10	7	7
(Ukraine) Shakhtar Donetsk	3	2	0	1	8	3	6
(Belgium) Action 21 Charleroi	3	1	0	2	7	11	3
(Serbia and Montenegro) KMF Marbo Beograd	3	0	1	2	7	11	1

Beograd	4–4	Dinamo
Charleroi	1–4	Shakhtar
Beograd	1–4	Shakhtar
Dinamo	5–3	Charleroi
Shakhtar	0–1	Dinamo
Charleroi	3–2	Beograd

== Knockout stage ==
=== Semifinals ===
11 March 2006	Shakhtar Donetsk (Ukraine)	1–6	(Spain) Boomerang Interviú	Donetsk
	Sytin 38'		Joan 9', 35'; Andreu 11', 20'; Marquinho 31'; Neto 34'

8 March 2006	Kairat Almaty (Kazakhstan)	0–3	(Russia) Dinamo Moskva
			Kudlay 4'; Nicolas 28'; Rakhimov 30'

25 March 2006	Boomerang Interviú (Spain)	5–3	(Ukraine) Shakhtar Donetsk	Alcalá
	Schumacher 3', 7'; Gabriel 10'; Marquinho 14'; Joan 17'		Mansurov 10'; Yunakov 27'; Moskvychov 33'

24 March 2006	Dinamo Moskva (Russia)	5–2	(Kazakhstan) Kairat Almaty
	Pelé 6'; Kelson 20'; Nicolas 27'; Kudlay 34'; Kobzar 39'		Camara Sobral 19'; Gustavo 31'

=== Final ===
29 April 2006	Boomerang Interviú (Spain)	6–3	(Russia) Dinamo Moskva	Alcalá de Henares
	Gabriel 5'; Schumacher 10', 18', 40'; Daniel 18'; Marquinho 31'		Cirilo 8'; Pelé 12'; Malyshev 15'	Attendance: 3500

7 May 2006	Dinamo Moskva (Russia)	4–3	(Spain) Boomerang Interviú	Moscow
	Cirilo 8'; Joan 36'; Maevski 37'; Tatu 39'		Julio 12'; Daniel 26'; Neto 40'	Attendance: 800

UEFA Futsal Cup
2005–06 Winners

Interviú
2nd Title
