= 2006–07 UEFA Futsal Cup =

Final positions
- Champions: (Russia) Dinamo Moskva
- Runners-up: (Spain) Interviú

The 2006–07 UEFA Futsal Cup was the 21st edition of Europe's premier club futsal tournament and the 6th edition under the current UEFA Futsal Cup format.

== Elite Round ==
=== Group A ===
	Team	Pld	W	D	L	GF	GA	GD	Pts
1.	(Spain) Boomerang Interviú	3	3	0	0	14	2	+12	9
2.	(Italy) Arzignano Grifo	3	2	0	1	10	10	0	6
3.	(Croatia) MNK Split	3	1	0	2	8	12	−4	3
4.	(Czech Republic) CC Jistebník	3	0	0	3	3	11	−8	0

(Italy) Verona, 7–10 December 2006

Boomerang Interviú (Spain)	3 – 0	(Czech Republic) CC Jistebník	December 7, 2006
Arzignano Grifo (Italy)	5 – 3	(Croatia) MNK Split	December 7, 2006
MNK Split (Croatia)	0 – 6	(Spain) Boomerang Interviú	December 8, 2006
Arzignano Grifo (Italy)	3 – 2	(Czech Republic) CC Jistebník	December 8, 2006
CC Jistebník (Czech Republic)	1 – 5	(Croatia) MNK Split	December 10, 2006
Boomerang Interviú (Spain)	5 – 2	(Italy) Arzignano Grifo	December 10, 2006

=== Group B ===
	Team	Pld	W	D	L	GF	GA	GD	Pts
1.	(Russia) Dinamo Moskva	3	2	1	0	18	4	+14	7
2.	(Romania) CIP Deva	3	1	1	1	7	15	−8	4
3.	(Ukraine) Shakhtar Donetsk	3	1	1	1	12	10	+2	4
4.	Sporting Portugal	3	0	1	2	5	13	−8	1

(Russia) Moscow, 4–7 December 2006

Shakhtar Donetsk (Ukraine)	3 – 4	(Romania) CIP Deva	December 4, 2006
Dinamo Moskva (Russia)	5 – 0	(Portugal) Sporting	December 4, 2006
Sporting (Portugal)	2 – 5	(Ukraine) Shakhtar Donetsk	December 5, 2006
Dinamo Moskva (Russia)	9 – 0	(Romania) CIP Deva	December 5, 2006
CIP Deva (Romania)	3 – 3	(Portugal) Sporting	December 7, 2006
Shakhtar Donetsk (Ukraine)	4 – 4	(Russia) Dinamo Moskva	December 7, 2006

=== Group C ===
	Team	Pld	W	D	L	GF	GA	GD	Pts
1.	(Belgium) Action 21 Charleroi	3	1	2	0	11	9	+2	5
2.	(Poland) Clearex Chorzów	3	1	2	0	9	8	+1	5
3.	(Serbia) Marbo Beograd	3	1	1	1	7	6	+1	4
4.	(Azerbaijan) Araz Naxçivan	3	0	1	2	8	12	−4	1

(Poland) Chorzów, 5–8 December 2006

Clearex Chorzów (Poland)	3 – 3	(Azerbaijan) Araz Naxçivan	December 5, 2006
Action 21 Charleroi (Belgium)	2 – 2	(Serbia) Marbo Beograd	December 5, 2006
Clearex Chorzów (Poland)	3 – 2	(Serbia) Marbo Beograd	December 6, 2006
Araz Naxçivan (Azerbaijan)	4 – 6	(Belgium) Action 21 Charleroi	December 6, 2006
Marbo Beograd (Serbia)	3 – 1	(Azerbaijan) Araz Naxçivan	December 8, 2006
Action 21 Charleroi (Belgium)	3 – 3	(Poland) Clearex Chorzów	December 8, 2006

=== Group D ===
	Team	Pld	W	D	L	GF	GA	GD	Pts
1.	(Spain) ElPozo Murcia	3	3	0	0	14	6	+8	9
2.	(Kazakhstan) AFC Kairat	3	2	0	1	7	5	+2	6
3.	(Belarus) Dorozhnik Minsk	3	1	0	2	7	12	−5	3
4.	(Hungary) Gödöllő FK	3	0	0	3	6	11	−5	0

(Hungary) Budapest, 7–10 December 2006

ElPozo Murcia (Spain)	6 – 1	(Belarus) Dorozhnik Minsk	December 7, 2006
Gödöllő FK (Hungary)	0 – 2	(Kazakhstan) Kairat	December 7, 2006
Kairat (Kazakhstan)	1 – 3	(Spain) ElPozo Murcia	December 8, 2006
Gödöllő FK (Hungary)	2 – 4	(Belarus) Dorozhnik Minsk	December 8, 2006
Dorozhnik Minsk (Belarus)	2 – 4	(Kazakhstan) Kairat	December 10, 2006
ElPozo Murcia (Spain)	5 – 4	(Hungary) Gödöllő FK	December 10, 2006

== Final four ==
The following teams have qualified for the Final Four round:

- (Spain) ElPozo Murcia FS
- (Spain) Boomerang Interviú
- (Russia) MFK Dinamo Moskva
- (Belgium) Action 21 Charleroi

Semi-finals
26 April – Palacio de Deportes, Murcia
(Russia) Dinamo Moskva	3
(Belgium) Action 21 Charleroi	1
26 April – Palacio de Deportes, Murcia
(Spain) ElPozo Murcia	2
(Spain) Boomerang Interviú	3

Final
28 April – Palacio de Deportes, Murcia
(Russia) Dinamo Moskva	2
(Spain) Boomerang Interviú	1
Third place
28 April – Palacio de Deportes, Murcia
(Belgium) Action 21 Charleroi	1
(Spain) ElPozo Murcia	1

=== Semifinals ===
26 April 2007	Dinamo Moskva (Russia)	3 – 1	(Belgium) Action 21 Charleroi	Palacio de Deportes, Murcia
	Pula 6'; Kobzar 22'; Kelson 38'		Chaibai 12'

26 April 2007	ElPozo Murcia (Spain)	2 – 3	(Spain) Boomerang Interviú	Palacio de Deportes, Murcia
	Kike 2'; Vinicius 35'		Marquinho 6'; Schumacher 39'; Daniel 40'

=== Final 3rd and 4th ===
28 April 2007	Action 21 Charleroi (Belgium)	1 – 1 (3–4 p)	(Spain) ElPozo Murcia	Palacio de Deportes, Murcia
	Chabai 8'		Vinicius 38'

=== Final ===
28 April 2007	Dinamo Moskva (Russia)	2 – 1	(Spain) Boomerang Interviú	Palacio de Deportes, Murcia
	Kelson 13'; Pula 40'		Neto 39'	Attendance: 2450

2007 UEFA Futsal Cup Champions
Dinamo Moskva
First title
