= Davi (futsal player) =

Brazilian futsal player

Personal information
- Full name: Davi Ribeiro de Carvalho
- Date of birth: 31 August 1979 (age 47)
- Place of birth: Porto Alegre, Brazil
- Height: 1.78 m (5 ft 10 in)
- Position: Defender

Youth career
- 1986–1993: Cruzeiro
- 1995–1998: América Mineiro

Senior career*
Years	Team	Apps	(Gls)
1998–2003	Minas Tênis Clube		
2003–2004	Kickers Charleroi		
2004–2006	Action 21		
2006–2009	Sporting CP		
2009–2013	Benfica		
2013–2014	Araz Naxçivan		
2014–2015	Sporting de Paris		
- * Club domestic league appearances and goals as of 8 December 2014

Davi Ribeiro de Carvalho (born 31 August 1979), known simply as Davi, is a Brazilian futsal player who last played for the French club Sporting de Paris as a defender.

== Career ==
Born in Porto Alegre, Brazil, Davi started developing his futsal skills at Cruzeiro Esporte Clube, playing in the futsal section from age 7 to age 11, then shifting to the football section, until he was 14. Two years later, at 16, he joined América Mineiro, still as a footballer, leaving when he was 19. Unable to find a football club, his fitness coach at América, arranged a tryout for him at Minas Tênis Clube, which he successfully passed.

In 2003, Davi joined the Belgian team Kickers Charleroi, reuniting with a number of friends, before moving to the larger Action 21 in the following year. In his first year at Action 21, he conquered the 2004–05 UEFA Futsal Cup by beating Dinamo Moskva in the final. A year later, impressed by his performance against them, Sporting CP, contacted him and brought him to Portugal, where he would spend three years with the Lions, winning two titles.

On 2 April 2009, Davi agreed to trade Sporting for crosstown rivals, Benfica for the following season. At Benfica, he made an immediate impact, scoring the decisive goal against Interviu at the 2009–10 UEFA Futsal Cup Final, on 25 April 2010, and being honoured with Most Valuable Player award. In the following three years, he conquered his first league title in Portugal, also winning another Portuguese Cup, plus three more supercups.

On 30 June 2013, Davi, together with César Paulo and Diego Sol, were released by Benfica, The 34-year-old then moved to Araz Naxçivan in the Azerbaijan league, reaching a third place in the 2013–14 UEFA Futsal Cup. On 30 October 2014, he moved to Sporting de Paris, progressing no further than the group stage of the 2014–15 UEFA Futsal Cup.

== Honours ==
Action 21 Charleroi

- Division 1: 2004/05, 2005/06
- UEFA Futsal Cup: 2004–05

Sporting CP

- Taça de Portugal: 2007–08
- Supertaça de Portugal: 2008

Benfica

- UEFA Futsal Cup: 2009–10
- Liga Portuguesa: 2011–12
- Taça de Portugal: 2011–12
- Supertaça de Portugal: 2009, 2011, 2012

Araz Naxçivan

- Azerbaijan Futsal Premier League: 2013—14
