= 2004–05 UEFA Futsal Cup =

Final positions
- Champions: (Belgium) Action 21
- Runners-up: (Russia) Dinamo Moskva

The 2004–05 UEFA Futsal Cup was the 19th edition of Europe's premier club futsal tournament and the 4th edition under the current UEFA Futsal Cup format.

== Preliminary round ==
Team	Pld	W	D	L	GF	GA	Pts
(Bulgaria) MAG Varna	2	1	1	0	16	9	4
(Albania) KF Tirana	2	1	1	0	9	7	4
(England) Sheffield Hallam	2	0	0	2	10	19	0

== First qualifying round ==
=== Group 1 ===
Team	Pld	W	D	L	GF	GA	Pts
(Spain) Boomerang Interviú	3	3	0	0	32	4	9
(Serbia and Montenegro) KMF Marbo Beograd	3	2	0	1	13	8	6
(Slovakia) 1. SC Incar Nitra	3	1	0	2	7	14	3
(Andorra) Cap del Carrer	3	0	0	3	1	27	0

=== Group 2 ===
Team	Pld	W	D	L	GF	GA	Pts
(Belarus) Dorozhnik Minsk	3	2	1	0	15	13	7
(Kazakhstan) AFC Kairat Almaty	3	2	0	1	14	6	6
(Croatia) MNK Split	3	1	1	1	8	12	4
(North Macedonia) Skopje	3	0	0	3	9	15	0

=== Group 3 ===
Team	Pld	W	D	L	GF	GA	Pts
Sporting Portugal	3	3	0	0	21	5	9
(Czech Republic) Era-Pack Chrudim	3	2	0	1	7	6	6
(Armenia) Polytechnic Yerevan	3	1	0	2	11	22	3
(Moldova) Camelot Chişinău	3	0	0	3	6	12	0

=== Group 4 ===
Team	Pld	W	D	L	GF	GA	Pts
(Spain) ElPozo Murcia	3	3	0	0	25	4	9
(Netherlands) FC Marlène	3	2	0	1	12	17	6
(Bosnia and Herzegovina) Karaka Mostar	3	1	0	2	14	18	3
(Cyprus) Ararat Nicosia	3	0	0	3	11	23	0

=== Group 5 ===
Team	Pld	W	D	L	GF	GA	Pts
(Belgium) Action 21 Charleroi	3	3	0	0	28	4	9
(Romania) Bodu Bucureşti	3	2	0	1	14	13	6
(Finland) Ilves FS	3	1	0	2	6	16	3
(Lithuania) Inkaras Kaunas	3	0	0	3	5	20	0

=== Group 6 ===
Team	Pld	W	D	L	GF	GA	Pts
(Russia) Dinamo Moskva	3	3	0	0	36	3	9
(Poland) Baustal Kraków	3	2	0	1	14	7	6
(Georgia (country)) Iberia Tbilisi	3	1	0	2	9	23	3
(Albania) KF Tirana	3	0	0	3	10	36	0

=== Group 7 ===
Team	Pld	W	D	L	GF	GA	Pts
(Slovenia) Lesna Litija	3	2	0	1	12	11	6
(Italy) Arzignano Grifo	3	2	0	1	21	9	6
(Latvia) Bugroff	3	1	1	1	10	16	4
(Azerbaijan) Turan Air Baku	3	0	1	2	7	14	1

=== Group 8 ===
Team	Pld	W	D	L	GF	GA	Pts
(Ukraine) Shakhtar Donetsk	2	2	0	0	12	1	6
(Hungary) Rubeola FC	2	1	0	1	8	6	3
(Bulgaria) MAG Varna	2	0	0	2	0	13	0

== Second qualifying round ==
=== Group A ===
Team	Pld	W	D	L	GF	GA	Pts
(Belgium) Action 21 Charleroi	3	2	1	0	12	7	7
(Spain) Boomerang Interviú	3	2	1	0	9	5	7
Sporting Portugal	3	1	0	2	13	12	3
(Slovenia) Litija	3	0	0	3	2	12	0

- Interviúì – Litija 3–0
- Charleroi – Sporting 7–4
- Sporting – Interviú 3–4
- Charleroi – Litija 3–1
- Litija – Sporting 1–6
- Interviú – Charleroi 2–2

=== Group B ===
Team	Pld	W	D	L	GF	GA	Pts
(Russia) Dinamo Moskva	3	3	0	0	21	12	9
(Spain) ElPozo Murcia	3	2	0	1	20	5	6
(Ukraine) Shakhtar	3	1	0	2	6	17	3
(Belarus) Dorozhnik Minsk	3	0	0	3	9	22	0

- Murcia – Dorozhnik Minsk 8–0
- Dinamo Moskva – Shakhtar 6–2
- Shakhtar – Murcia 0–8
- Dinamo Moskva – Dorozhnik Minsk 10–6
- Dorozhnik Minsk – Shakhtar 3–4
- Murcia – Dinamo Moskva 4–5

== Final ==
The 2005 UEFA Futsal Cup Final was played on April 23, 2005, at the Spiroudôme in Charleroi, Belgium and April 30, 2005, at the Sport Hall "Druzhba" in Moscow, Russia. Action 21 won 10–9 on aggregate.

23 April 2005	(Belgium) Action 21 Charleroi	4 – 3	(Russia) Dinamo Moskva	Spiroudome, Charleroi
	André 11'; Robinho 11'; Alex 12'; Eder 18'		Cirilo 12'; Pelé 22'; Maevski 33'	Attendance: 6500

30 April 2005	(Russia) Dinamo Moskva	6 – 6 (aet)	(Belgium) Action 21 Charleroi	Sport Hall "Druzhba", Moskva
	Ivanov 2', 38'; Joan 26', 42'; Kudlay 32'; Cirilo 45'		Alex 9', 19'; André 34'; Henrique 42'; Kelson 48'; Eder 48'	Attendance: 2000

UEFA Futsal Cup
2004–05 Winners

Action 21 Charleroi
1st Title

== Top goalscorers ==
Pos	Player	Club	Goals
1	(Russia) Sergei Ivanov	(Russia) Dinamo Moskva	14
2	(Brazil) Joan	(Russia) Dinamo Moskva	12
3	(Russia) Cirilo	(Russia) Dinamo Moskva	11
4	(Spain) Andreu	(Spain) Boomerang Interviú	10
5	(Spain) Paulo Roberto	(Spain) ElPozo Murcia	9
