= 2005 UEFA Futsal Championship =

2005 Evropský Šampionát Futsalu

Tournament details
- Host country: Czech Republic
- Dates: 14–20 February
- Teams: 8 (from 1 confederation)
- Venue: 2 (in 1 host city)

Final positions
- Champions: Spain (3rd title)
- Runners-up: Russia
- Third place: Italy
- Fourth place: Ukraine

Tournament statistics
- Matches played: 16
- Goals scored: 87 (5.44 per match)
- Top scorer: (Italy) Nando Grana (6 goals)
- Best player: (Spain) Luis Amado

The 2005 UEFA Futsal Championship was the fifth official edition of the UEFA-governed European Championship for national futsal teams. It was held in Ostrava, Czech Republic, between 14 February and 20 February 2005. Spain, the reigning FIFA World Champion, defeated Russia in the final, winning their third (with 1996 and 2001) UEFA Championship. The third place match was a repeat of the 2003 final, with Italy again defeating Ukraine, this time 3–1. Fernando Grana's opener in the third place match helped him finish as top scorer in the tournament with six goals.

== Venues ==
The tournament played the majority of the matches in the 10,000 seat ČEZ Aréna in the city of Ostrava. The other arena used on the last day of group matches was the Sareza.

== Referees ==
- (Russia) Anton Averianov
- (Slovenia) Silvo Borosak
- (Italy) Massimo Cumbo
- (Portugal) Antonio Jose Fernandes Cardoso
- (Finland) Jyrki Filppu
- (Spain) Pedro Ángel Galán Nieto
- (Poland) Christian Hauben
- (Poland) Zbigniew Kosmala
- (Czech Republic) Radek Lobo
- (Croatia) Ivan Novak
- (Hungary) Károly Török
- (Netherlands) Antonius van Eekelen

== Qualification ==
Twenty-eight nations took part in the qualifying round, with hosts Czech Republic automatically qualified.

Qualifying was played in two stages, with 8 sides competing in the preliminary round between 6–11 January 2004. The winners of the two groups progressed to join the other 26 entrants in the next phase. In the main qualifying round, which took place between 27 January-1 February, there was seven groups of four with the first-placed teams advancing to the final tournament.

=== Qualified teams ===
Country	Qualified as	Previous appearances in tournament^{1}
Czech Republic	Hosts	2 (2001, 2003)
Spain	Group 4 winner	4 (**1996**, 1999, **2001**, 2003)
Italy	Group 7 winner	4 (1996, 1999, 2001, **2003**)
Russia	Group 5 winner	4 (1996, **1999**, 2001, 2003)
Ukraine	Group 2 winner	3 (1996, 2001, 2003)
Netherlands	Group 1 winner	3 (1996, 1999, 2001)
Portugal	Group 3 winner	2 (1999, 2003)
Hungary	Group 6 winner	0 (Debut)

^{1} Bold indicates champion for that year

== Final tournament ==
=== Group stage ===
==== Group A ====
Team	Pld	W	D	L	GF	GA	GD	Pts
Ukraine	3	2	0	1	7	4	+3	6
Russia	3	2	0	1	10	6	+4	6
Netherlands	3	1	0	2	8	12	−4	3
Czech Republic	3	1	0	2	6	9	−3	3

14 February 2005
16:30

Czech Republic	2–1	Ukraine
Mareš 18'; Rajnoch 34'	Report	Kudlay 12'

ČEZ Aréna, Ostrava
Referee: Károly Török (Hungary)

14 February 2005
18:30

Russia	5–3	Netherlands
Markin 16', 38'; Hulshorst 17' (o.g.); Shayakhmetov 38', 39'	Report	Hulshorst 24'; Merlino 35'; Tjaden 39'

ČEZ Aréna, Ostrava
Referee: Massimo Cumbo (Italy)

15 February 2005
16:30

Czech Republic	1–4	Russia
Šluka 17'	Report	Ivanov 7'; Shayakhmetov 20'; Maevski 25'; Abyshev 37'

ČEZ Aréna, Ostrava
Referee: Pedro Ángel Galán Nieto (Spain)

15 February 2005
20:30

Ukraine	4–1	Netherlands
Pylypiv 13'; Sytin 18', 38'; Koridze 39'	Report	Thies 23'

ČEZ Aréna, Ostrava
Referee: Károly Török (Hungary)

17 February 2005
17:30

Netherlands	4–3	Czech Republic
Merlino 3'; Makhoukhi 8'; Šluka 10' (o.g.); Hulshorst 14'	Report	Dlouhý 9'; Mareš 15'; Rajnoch 24'

ČEZ Aréna, Ostrava
Referee: Antonio Jose Fernandes Cardoso (Portugal)

17 February 2005
17:30

Ukraine	2–1	Russia
Sytin 9'; Markin 23' (o.g.)	Report	Khamadiyev 37'

Sareza, Ostrava
Referee: Silvo Borosak (Slovenia)

==== Group B ====
Team	Pld	W	D	L	GF	GA	GD	Pts
Italy	3	3	0	0	16	4	+12	9
Spain	3	2	0	1	8	6	+2	6
Portugal	3	1	0	2	9	14	−5	3
Hungary	3	0	0	3	5	14	−9	0

14 February 2005
12:30

Italy	8–3	Portugal
Jubanski 3'; Assad 17', 22'; Grana 18', 19', 35'; Bertoni 25'; Montovanelli 31'	Report	Alves 14'; Queirós 29'; André Lima 36'

ČEZ Aréna, Ostrava
Referee: Ivan Novak (Croatia)

14 February 2005
14:30

Hungary	2–4	Spain
Simon 28'; Frank 33'	Report	Torras 27'; Javi Rodríguez 35', 36'; Daniel 38'

ČEZ Aréna, Ostrava
Referee: Radek Lobo (Czech Republic)

15 February 2005
14:30

Italy	5–0	Hungary
Foglia 1'; Grana 13', 23'; Scala 17', 19'	Report

ČEZ Aréna, Ostrava
Referee: Jyrki Filppu (Finland)

15 February 2005
18:30

Portugal	1–3	Spain
Marcelinho 35'	Report	Javi Rodríguez 7'; Daniel 11'; Kike 39'

ČEZ Aréna, Ostrava
Referee: Anton Averianov (Russia)

17 February 2005
19:30

Portugal	5–3	Hungary
Alves 25', 26', 29'; André Lima 38'; Queirós 38'	Report	Lódi 17', 26'; Tóth 35'

Sareza, Ostrava
Referee: Massimo Cumb (Italy)

17 February 2005
19:30

Spain	1–3	Italy
Torras 26'	Report	Bácaro 4'; Scala 26'; Bertoni 29'

ČEZ Aréna, Ostrava
Referee: Anton Averianov (Russia)

=== Knockout stage ===
Semi-finals
18 February – Ostrava
Ukraine	0
Spain	5
18 February – Ostrava
Italy	2
Russia	4

Final
20 February – Ostrava
Spain	2
Russia	1
Third place
20 February – Ostrava
Ukraine	1
Italy	3

=== Semi-finals ===
18 February 2005
16:30

Ukraine	0–5	Spain
	Report	Andreu 9', 37'; Daniel 30'; Serrejón 31', 34'

ČEZ Aréna, Ostrava
Attendance: 1723
Referee: Ivan Novak (Croatia)

18 February 2005
18:30

Italy	2–4	Russia
Zanetti 3', 24'	Report	Shayakhmetov 14', 32'; Ivanov 36'; Levin 37'

ČEZ Aréna, Ostrava
Attendance: 2000
Referee: Károly Török (Hungary)

=== Third place ===
20 February 2005
14:00

Ukraine	1–3	Italy
Sytin 9'	Report	Grana 6'; Assad 16'; Zanetti 21'

ČEZ Aréna, Ostrava
Attendance: 2531
Referee: Ivan Novak (Croatia)

=== Final ===
20 February 2005
17:15

Spain	2–1	Russia
Andreu 9'; Cogorro 21'	Report	Douchkevitch 31'

ČEZ Aréna, Ostrava
Attendance: 3688
Referee: Károly Török (Hungary)

== Champions ==
2005 UEFA Futsal Championship winners

Spain
Third title

== Tournament ranking ==
Per statistical convention in football, matches decided in extra time are counted as wins and losses, while matches decided by penalty shoot-out are counted as draws.

Pos	Team	Pld	W	D	L	GF	GA	GD	Pts	Final result
1	Spain	5	4	0	1	15	7	+8	12	Champions
2	Russia	5	3	0	2	15	10	+5	9	Runners-up
3	Italy	5	4	0	1	21	9	+12	12	Third place
4	Ukraine	5	2	0	3	8	12	-4	6	Fourth place
5	Czech Republic	3	1	0	2	6	9	–3	3	Eliminated in Group stage
6	Netherlands	3	1	0	2	8	12	–4	3	Eliminated in Group stage
7	Portugal	3	1	0	2	9	14	–5	3	Eliminated in Group stage
8	Hungary	3	0	0	3	5	14	–9	0	Eliminated in Group stage

== Top goalscorers ==
Scorer	Nation	Goals
Fernando Grana	Italy	6
Vladislav Shayakhmetov	Russia	5
Gonçalo Alves	Portugal	4
Sergey Sytin	Ukraine	4
Assad Fabiano	Italy	3
Carlos Scalal	Italy	3
Sandro Zanetti	Italy	3
Andreu	Spain	3
Daniel	Spain	3
Javi Rodríguez	Spain	3
