= Dimitar Pantev =

Bulgarian footballer and manager

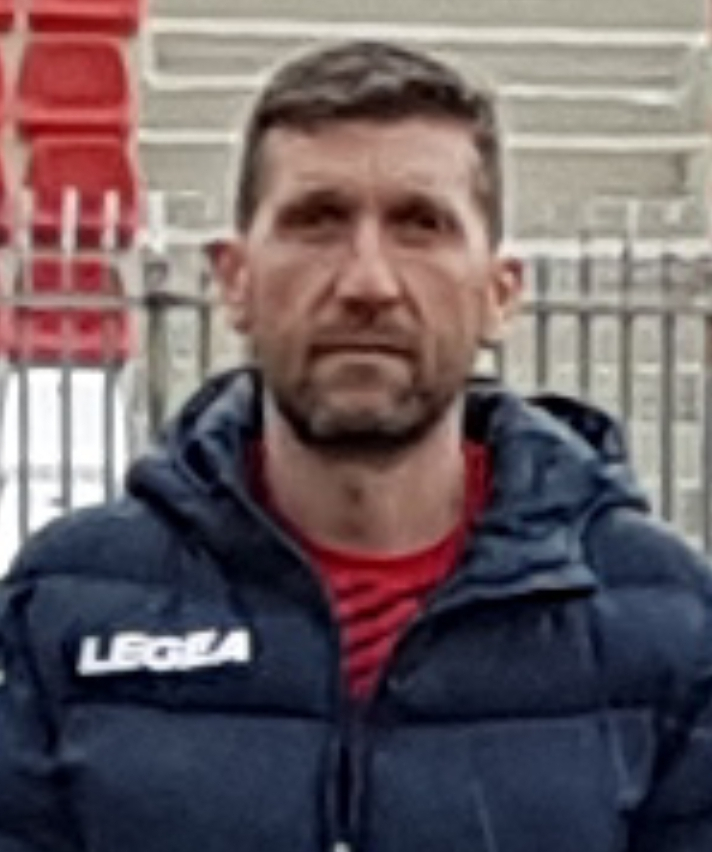

Personal information
- Full name: Dimitar Nikolaev Pantev
- Date of birth: 26 June 1976 (age 50)
- Place of birth: Varna, Bulgaria
- Height: 1.78 m (5 ft 10 in)
- Position: Midfielder

Team information
- Current team: Tonota FC (manager)

Youth career
- 1984–1995: Cherno More

Senior career*
Years	Team	Apps	(Gls)
1995–1998	Cherno More		
1995–1997	→ Suvorovo (loan)		
1997–1998	→ Devnya (loan)		
1998–2000	Suvorovo		
2000–2001	Chernomorets Byala		
2005–2006	Kaliakra Kavarna		
2006–2007	Chernomorets Balchik		
2007–2008	Volov Shumen		
2008–2009	Dobrudzha		
2009–2010	Vladislav		
2010–2011	Shabla		
2015–2016	Spartak Varna	22	(0)

Managerial career
- 2006–2008: Varna City (youth)
- 2008–2009: Dobrudzha (player-assistant)
- 2009–2010: Vladislav Varna (player-manager)
- 2010–2011: Shabla (player-manager)
- 2011–2017: Grand Pro Varna (futsal)
- 2011–2015: DFC Delfinite (youth)
- 2013–2014: Bulgaria (futsal)
- 2015–2016: Spartak Varna (player-manager)
- 2016–2017: Bulgaria (futsal)
- 2018–2019: Al Ahli Hebron (assistant)
- 2019: Alshoban Almuslimin Hebron
- 2020: H16 Youth Academy
- 2021: Svetkavitsa
- 2022: Flamengo KSA Academy
- 2022–2023: Victoria United
- 2023: Johansen
- 2024: Victoria United
- 2024: Orapa United
- 2025: Gaborone United
- 2025–2026: Simba
- 2026: Richards Bay
- 2026-: Tonota FC
- * Club domestic league appearances and goals

Dimitar Pantev (Bulgarian: Димитър Пантев; born 26 June 1976) is a Bulgarian professional football manager and former player. He is currently manager of South African Premiership club Tonota FC. As a manager, he has worked for Vladislav Varna, Shabla, futsal club Grand Pro Varna, Bulgaria national futsal team, Spartak Varna, Palestinian club Alshoban Almuslimin Hebron, Svetkavitsa Targovishte, Victoria United in Cameroon, Sierra Leonean club Johansen, Orapa United and Gaborone United in Botswana, Tanzanian Premier League side Simba.

== Playing career ==
Born in Varna, Pantev began his football career at Cherno More in 1995. After a loan spells with Suvorovo and Devnya, he moved permanently to Suvorovo in 1998. Then he played for Chernomorets Byala, Kaliakra Kavarna, Chernomorets Balchik, Volov Shumen, Dobrudzha Dobrich and Vladislav Varna. He ended his playing career with Shabla in 2011. Four years later, at the age of 39, Pantev returned to playing as a player-manager of Spartak Varna, and played one season before retiring again in June 2016.

== Managerial career ==
=== Early career ===
Pantev began his managerial career as a youth coach in Varna City. During 2008–09 season he was a playing assistant coach of Dobrudzha Dobrich. He also worked as a head coach of Vladislav Varna and Shabla in the Bulgarian Third League.

=== Futsal ===
In 2011 Pantev was appointed playing manager of futsal club Grand Pro Varna. During his 6 years with the club he won five consecutive Bulgarian Premiere Futsal League titles, leading the club to the Elite round of 2013–14 UEFA Futsal Cup. He also managed two times Bulgaria national futsal team.

=== In Europe ===
==== Spartak Varna ====
On 31 August 2015, Pantev was appointed manager of Spartak Varna, leading the club to promotion to the Third League in 2016.

=== In Asia ===
In 2018–19 season, Pantev was an assistant coach of Palestinian club Al Ahli Hebron. In July 2019, he became a manager of Alshoban Almuslimin Hebron. In early 2020, Pantev was appointed technical director and head coach of Indian Youth Academy H16.

=== In Africa ===
==== Victoria United ====
In July 2022, Pantev was appointed manager of Victoria United in Cameroon, with whom he won 2022 South West Regional League.

On 21 March 2024, Pantev returned to Victoria United. He subsequently led Victoria to their first Elite One title in club's history.

==== Gaborone United ====
On 23 January 2025, Pantev was appointed as a manager of Gaborone United, leading the side to a Botswana Premier League title in his first season at the club.

==== Simba ====
On 4 September 2025, Pantev was appointed as a Chief manager of Simba. His tenure at the club was short-lived. On 2 December 2025, Simba SC announced that they had mutually agreed to terminate his contract, along with those of his two assistants, after only 61 days in charge.

==== Richards Bay ====
In September 2026 Pantev joined Richards Bay as manager, however he left after only three games, losing them all.

==== Tonota FC ====
Shortly after leaving Richards Bay Pantev joined Botswana Premier League team Tonota FC on a 20-month deal.

== Honours ==
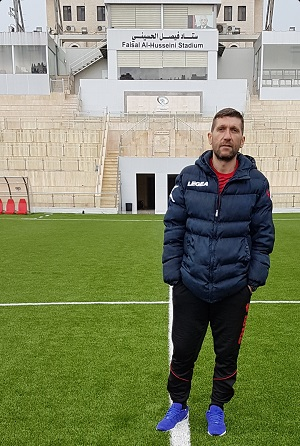
Pantev in 2022

=== Manager ===
==== Futsal ====
Grand Pro Varna

- Bulgarian Futsal League (5): 2011–12, 2012–13, 2013–14, 2014–15, 2015–16

==== Football ====
Spartak Varna

- A RFG – Varna: 2015–16

Victoria United

- South West Regional League: 2022
- Elite One: 2023–24

Gaborone United

- Botswana Premier League: 2024–25
