= Thero Setsile =

Motswana footballer (born 1995)

Thero Sessile
Personal information
- Full name: Francis Thero Setsile
- Date of birth: 8 October 1995 (age 31)
- Place of birth: Maun, Botswana
- Height: 1.80 m (5 ft 11 in)
- Position: Midfielder

Team information
- Current team: Tonota

Senior career*
Years	Team	Apps	(Gls)
2013–2014	ECCO City Green		
2014–2015	Sankoyo Bush Bucks		
2015–2019	Jwaneng Galaxy		
2019–2020	TS Galaxy	2	(0)
2020–2022	Jwaneng Galaxy		
2022–2026	Gaborone United		
2026–	Tonota		

International career^{‡}
2017–	Botswana	32	(3)
- * Club domestic league appearances and goals as of 22:36, 10 November 2024 (UTC) ‡ National team caps and goals as of 22:36, 10 November 2024 (UTC)

Francis Thero Setsile (born 8 October 1995) is a Motswana footballer who plays for Tonota as a midfielder.

== Career ==
Born in Maun, Setsile has played club football for ECCO City Green, Sankoyo Bush Bucks, Jwaneng Galaxy, TS Galaxy, and Gaborone United. He signed for Tonota in May 2026.

He made his international debut for Botswana in 2017. In November 2019, he was one of four Botswana international players dropped from the national team after they had been drinking alcohol.
