= 2007–08 Israeli Futsal League =

Israeli Futsal League
- Season: 2007–08
- UEFA Futsal Cup: Hapoel Ironi Rishon LeZion
- Top goalscorer: 35 goals Yehuda Zisman (Maccabi Nahlat Itzhak Tel Aviv)

The 2007–08 season of the Israeli Futsal League was the 2nd season of top-tier futsal under the Israel Football Association and 8th overall. The regular season started on 20 November 2007 and was concluded on 7 April 2008. The championship playoffs began on 8 April 2008 with semi-finals series and concluded with the championship final series from 17 to 24 April.

Hapoel Ironi Rishon LeZion were the defending champions and kept the title by defeating Yanshufei Agudat Sport Tel Aviv 2 games to 1 in the 2007–08 Championship Final series.

== Regular season table ==
Pos	Team	Pld	W	D	L	GF	GA	GD	Pts	Qualification or relegation
1	Hapoel Ironi Rishon LeZion	16	15	0	1	131	44	+87	45	Qualification to the championship playoffs
2	Yanshufei Agudat Sport Tel Aviv	16	15	0	1	133	50	+83	45	Qualification to the championship playoffs
3	Ironi Petah Tikva	16	10	1	5	103	89	+14	31	Qualification to the championship playoffs
4	ASA Ben-Gurion University	16	8	1	7	67	62	+5	25	Qualification to the championship playoffs
5	Hapoel Bnei Kafr Qasim	16	8	1	7	106	112	−6	25	
6	Hapoel Rishon LeZion West	16	4	0	12	83	98	−15	12	
7	Ironi Kiryat Ata	16	4	0	12	49	106	−57	12	
8	SC Rosh HaAyin/Petah Tikva	16	3	1	12	86	140	−54	10	
9	Maccabi Dynamo Holon	16	3	0	13	56	113	−57	9	

Updated to match(es) played on 7 April 2008. Source: IFA – Futsal League

== Championship playoffs ==
=== Calendar ===
Round	Date	Fixtures	Clubs	Notes
Semifinals	8/10/13 April 2008	6	4 → 2	
Final	17/22/24 April 2008	3	2 → 1	

=== Bracket ===
Semifinals
1	Hapoel Ironi R. Lezion	3	3	4
3	ASA Ben-Gurion University	2	5	2
2	Yanshufei Tel Aviv	3	3	7
3	Ironi Petah Tikva	2	3	3

Final
1	Hapoel Ironi R. Lezion	3	5	5
2	Yanshufei Tel Aviv	4	2	4

2007–08 Israeli Futsal League winners
Hapoel Ironi Rishon LeZion
Second title
