= MFC Shakhtar Donetsk =

Shakhtar Donetsk
- Full name: MFC Shakhtar Donetsk
- Founded: 1998
- Dissolved: 2011
- Ground: Druzhba Arena, Donetsk, Ukraine
- League: Ukrainian Futsal Championship
- 2010–11: Ukrainian Futsal Championship, 8th
Home colours	Away colours

MFC Shakhtar Donetsk was a futsal team from Donetsk, Ukraine.

The team was founded in 1998 as Ukrsplav, and after a year came up from the second league to the first one. The team was dissolved in January 2011.

Shakhtar is the most successful club in Ukrainian futsal history, with 5 national championships.

== Honours ==
=== Domestic ===
- Ukrainian Championship

(gold) Winners (5) (record): 2001–02, 2003–04, 2004–05, 2005–06, 2007–08
(silver) Runners-up (3): 2003, 2009, 2010
(bronze) Third place (1): 2007

- Ukrainian Futsal Cup:

(gold) Winners (3): 2002–03, 2003–04, 2005–06
(silver) Runners-up (3): 2000–01, 2004–05, 2008–09

- Ukrainian Futsal Super Cup:

(gold) Winners (3): 2005, 2006, 2008

- Ukrainian First League (second tier):

(gold) Winners (1): 1998–99

=== European ===
- UEFA Futsal Cup:

Semifinal: 2005–06

== MFC Shakhtar Donetsk in European football ==
As of match played November 2008

Season	Round	Opponent	Score	Result
2002–03	First qualifying round Group 2	(Finland) Kemi-Tornio	12–0	W
2002–03	First qualifying round Group 2	(Cyprus) Ararat Nicosia	20–0	W
2002–03	First qualifying round Group 2	(Moldova) Zaria Bălți	8–2	W
2002–03	Second qualifying round Group B	(Italy) Prato	1–4	L
2002–03	Second qualifying round Group B	(Spain) Playas de Castellón	4–5	L
2002–03	Second qualifying round Group B	(Serbia and Montenegro) KMF Niš	4–2	W
2004–05	Main round Group 8	(Bulgaria) MAG Varna	6–0	W
2004–05	Main round Group 8	(Hungary) Rubeola FC	6–1	W
2004–05	Elite round Group B	(Russia) Dinamo Moskva	2–6	L
2004–05	Elite round Group B	(Belarus) Dorozhnik Minsk	4–3	W
2004–05	Elite round Group B	(Spain) ElPozo Murcia	0–8	L
2005–06	First qualifying round Group 8	(Slovakia) Slov-Matic Bratislava	5–2	W
2005–06	First qualifying round Group 8	(Finland) Ilves FS	11–0	W
2005–06	First qualifying round Group 8	(Croatia) Orkan Zagreb	3–1	W
2005–06	Second qualifying round Group B	(Belgium) Action 21 Charleroi	4–1	W
2005–06	Second qualifying round Group B	(Serbia and Montenegro) Marbo Beograd	4–1	W
2005–06	Second qualifying round Group B	(Russia) Dinamo Moskva	0–1	L
2005–06	Semifinals	(Spain) Boomerang Interviú (Leg 1, (Ukraine) Donetsk)	1–6	L
2005–06	Semifinals	(Spain) Boomerang Interviú (Leg 2, (Spain) Alcalá)	3–5	L
2006–07	Main round Group stage	(Moldova) Toligma Chișinău	6–1	W
2006–07	Main round Group stage	(Hungary) FC Rába	3–0	W
2006–07	Main round Group stage	(Hungary) Gödöllő FK	11–0	W
2006–07	Elite round Moscow, Russia	(Romania) CIP Deva	3–4	L
2006–07	Elite round Moscow, Russia	(Portugal) Sporting CP	5–2	W
2006–07	Elite round Moscow, Russia	(Russia) Dinamo Moskva	4–4	D
2008–09	Main round Debrecen, Hungary	(Netherlands) Blok Beverwijk	4–0	W
2008–09	Main round Debrecen, Hungary	(Croatia) HMNK Gospić	4–4	D
2008–09	Main round Debrecen, Hungary	(Hungary) MVFC Berettyóújfalu	8–1	W
2008–09	Elite round Group A	(Slovakia) Slov-Matic Bratislava	7–1	W
2008–09	Elite round Group A	(Italy) Luparense	2–3	L
2008–09	Elite round Group A	(Russia) Sinara Yekaterinburg	3–4	L

=== Summary ===
Season	Pld	W	D	L	GF	GA	Last round
2002–03	6	4	0	2	49	13	2nd qualifying round
2004–05	5	3	0	2	18	18	Elite round
2005–06	8	5	0	3	31	17	Semifinals
2006–07	6	4	1	1	32	11	Elite round
2008–09	6	3	1	2	28	13	Elite round
Total	31	19	2	10	158	72	

== See also ==
- FC Shakhtar Donetsk
