= FC Odesos =

- Founded: 2001
- Ground: Vladislav Arena, Varna
- Managers: Penko Zlatev and Tsvetan Milanov
- League: Bulgarian Futsal Championship
- Website: http://odesos-futsal.com/
Home colours	Away colours

FC Odesos is a futsal team based in Varna, Bulgaria. It plays in Bulgarian Futsal Championship. The club was officially founded in 2005. Club colors are black and white.

== Current Squad 2008/09 ==
#		Name	Age	Last Club
0	(Bulgaria)	Kostadin Ivanov (GK)
1	(Bulgaria)	Boyko Kosev	31	FC MAG
6	(Bulgaria)	Dobromir Tsenkov
7	(Bulgaria)	Kostadin Dimitrov
8	(Bulgaria)	Tihomir Ivanov
10	(Bulgaria)	Simeon Hristov
11	(Bulgaria)	Petar Karadzhov
12	(Bulgaria)	Atanas Atanasov
17	(Bulgaria)	Georgi Minkov
19	(Bulgaria)	Pavel Adamov
20	(Bulgaria)	Kaloyan Tsvetkov	25
23	(Bulgaria)	Ivan Viktorov	25
