= Marcão (futsal player) =

Brazilian futsal player

Personal information
- Full name: Marcos Pacheco Affini
- Date of birth: 18 June 1984 (age 42)
- Place of birth: São Paulo, Brazil
- Height: 1.77 m (5 ft 9 1/2 in)
- Position: Goalkeeper

Team information
- Current team: Belenenses

Senior career*
Years	Team	Apps	(Gls)
–2006	Ferraz		
2007–2010	Belenenses		
2011	Al Rayyan		
2011–2014	Benfica		
2014–2015	Kairat Almaty		
2015–	Sporting CP	87	(6)
2018–	→ Belenenses (loan)	8	(1)
- * Club domestic league appearances and goals as of 00:00, 7 August 2018 (UTC)

Marcos Pacheco Affini (born 18 June 1984), known as Marcão, is a Brazilian futsal player who play as a goalkeeper for CF Belenenses on loan from Sporting CP.

== Career ==
Born in São Paulo, Marcão started his career in the amateur team, EC Ferraz, in the city of Ferraz de Vasconcelos. On 8 August 2007, he moved to Portugal to join C.F. Os Belenenses, arriving at the same time as Diego Sol.

At the Belém-side, he, and others like Pedro Cary, Paulinho and Marcelinho, helped the club reach two playoffs finals against Benfica, losing both, plus two Portuguese Cup finals, winning one, and losing another.

In January 2011, Marcão moved to the Qatar Futsal League, to play for Al Rayyan, staying just eight months, but winning the league title with the Qatari club. On 2 August 2011, he returned to Portugal and joined Benfica. In the three years he spent with them, Marcão won one league title, his second Portuguese Cup, plus two supercups.

In June 2014, Marcão joined AFC Kairat in the Kazakhstani Futsal Championship. At Kairat, he acted mainly as a back-up for Leo Higuita, his replacement at Belenenses, in a side that conquered the 2014–15 UEFA Futsal Cup against Barcelona in Lisbon.

A year after leaving to Kazakhstan, Marcão returned for a third stint in Portugal, joining Sporting CP on 21 July. In three years spent with Sporting, bitter rivals of SL Benfica, Marcão won three league titles, two Portuguese cups, two league cup titles and two regional cups (Taça de Honra). In the summer of 2018, Marcão returned to CF Belenenses on loan from Sporting CP.

== Honours ==
CF Os Belenenses

- Taça de Portugal de Futsal: 2009–10

Al Rayyan

- Qatar Futsal League: 2010–11

SL Benfica

- Liga Portuguesa de Futsal: 2011–12
- Taça de Portugal de Futsal: 2011–12
- SuperTaça de Futsal de Portugal: 2011,2012

AFC Kairat

- UEFA Futsal Cup: 2014–15

Sporting CP

- Liga Portuguesa de Futsal: 2015–16, 2016–17, 2017–18
- Taça de Portugal de Futsal: 2015–16, 2017–18
- Taça da Liga de Futsal: 2015–16, 2016–17
- Taça de Honra da AF Lisboa: 2015–16, 2016–17

== Personal life ==
He is the older brother of Lucas Sasha, a footballer who plays for Ludogorets Razgrad.
