= 2005 UEFA Futsal Championship squads =

This article lists the confirmed national futsal squads for the 2005 UEFA Futsal Championship tournament held in Czech Republic.
