= Bafodé =

Bafodé is a given name. Notable people with the name include:

- Bafodé Dansoko (born 1995), French footballer
- Bafodé Diakité (born 2001), French footballer
