= Israeli Futsal League =

- Founded: 1998
- Country: Israel
- Confederation: UEFA
- Number of clubs: 8
- Level on pyramid: 1
- International cup: UEFA Futsal Cup
- Current champions: ASA Ben-Gurion University (2013–14)
- Website: Futsal Israel (in Hebrew)
- Current: 2013–14 (in Hebrew)

The Israeli Futsal League is the premier futsal league in Israel it is organized by Israel Football Association. The League winner qualify to the UEFA Futsal Cup.

== History ==
A national futsal league was first organized informally in the early 1990s, building upon the success of the Israel national futsal team in the 1989 and 1992 UEFS Futsal Men's Championship. In 1998, a semi-professional league was organized with the IFA, which ran for two seasons, in 1999 and 2000, and was re-organized as a professional league, sponsored by Coca-Cola, which was called "5X5 Coca-Cola League". This league ran for three seasons, two (winter and summer) in 2003 and one in 2004. During this period there was an attempt to organize a Women's Futsal League, which ran for two seasons.. In 2006 the league was re-organized, this time under the name "Israeli Futsal League", and with better cooperation with the IFA. Starting from 2004 league champions competed in the UEFA Futsal Cup, with the best achievement coming from Hapoel Ironi Rishon, who qualified for the Elite round in both 2008 and 2009

== Former Champions ==
Season	Winner
Futsal League
1999	Yanshufei Agudat Sport Tel Aviv
2000	Yanshufei Agudat Sport Tel Aviv
5X5 Coca-Cola League
2002–03 (winter)	HaShalom Beer Sheva
2003 (summer)	HaShalom Beer Sheva
2004	Beitar Jerusalem (futsal)
Israeli Futsal League
2005–06	HaShalom Beer Sheva
2006–07	Hapoel Ironi Rishon Lezion (futsal)
2007–08	Hapoel Ironi Rishon Lezion (futsal)
2008–09	Yanshufei Agudat Sport Tel Aviv
2009–10	Yanshufei Agudat Sport Tel Aviv
2010–11	ASA Ben-Gurion University
2011–12	Maccabi Nahalat Yitzhak Tel Aviv
2012–13	ASA Ben-Gurion University
2013–14	ASA Ben-Gurion University
2014–15	ASA Ben-Gurion University

== Israel Futsal State Cup ==
For a single season, in 2010, the IFA arranged a cup competition for futsal club, which was played after the league was completed, between October and December 2012. The winner of the competition was Yanshufei Agudat Sport Tel Aviv, who have beaten Hapoel Ironi Rishon Lezion (futsal) 8–7 in the final, and completed the double for the season.
