= Kairat Almaty =

Kairat Almaty may refer to:

- FC Kairat, football club
- AFC Kairat, futsal club
