= Pantev =

Pantev is a Bulgarian surname. Notable people with the surname include:

- Andrey Pantev (born 1939), Bulgarian historian
- Dimitar Pantev (born 1976), Bulgarian footballer and manager
