= Diego Sol =

Brazilian futsal player

Personal information
- Full name: Diego de Branco Sol
- Date of birth: 31 July 1984 (age 42)
- Place of birth: São Paulo, Brazil
- Height: 1.82 m (5 ft 11 1/2 in)
- Position: Winger

Senior career*
Years	Team	Apps	(Gls)
2001–2003	Barueri		
2003	Banespa		
2004	Caldense		
2005	São José		
2005–2006	Corinthians		
2007	Ferraz		
2007–2010	Os Belenenses		
2010–2013	Benfica		
2014	Lokomotiv Kharkiv		
- * Club domestic league appearances and goals as of 20 September 2012

Diego de Branco Sol (born 31 July 1984) is a Brazilian futsal player who plays as a winger.

== Career ==
Born in São Paulo, Sol career started in the futsal section of Grêmio Barueri, representing them for three seasons. In 2003, he played for EC Banespa on a brief period, making his first move out of his hometown in the next year, when he competed in the futsal section of Caldense on the Brazilian state of Minas Gerais.

In 2005, he returned to São Paulo, to play for the futsal section of São José, spending one year there, and moving immediately after to the larger Corinthians. After a quick spell at EC Ferraz, on 8 August 2007, he moved to Portugal to join C.F. Os Belenenses, arriving at the same time as Marcão.

At the Belém-side, Sol was a regular starter in a squad, alongside players like, Pedro Cary, Paulinho, Marcelinho and Marcão, that took part in the club most successful period in recent history, reaching two playoffs finals against Benfica, plus two Portuguese Cup finals, winning one, and losing another.

On 8 August 2010, he moved to Benfica, representing them for three years, winning four titles, including the Portuguese league on his second year. On 30 June 2013, Sol, together with César Paulo and Davi, were released by the club, spending six months without club, until he joined Lokomotiv Kharkiv in January 2014, helping them win a second consecutive league.

== Honours ==
CF Os Belenenses

- Taça de Portugal de Futsal: 2009–10

SL Benfica

- Liga Portuguesa de Futsal: 2011–12
- Taça de Portugal de Futsal: 2011–12
- SuperTaça de Futsal de Portugal: 2010–11, 2011–12

Lokomotiv Kharkiv

- Extra-Liga: 2013–14
