= Gabriel (futsal player) =

Brazilian futsal player

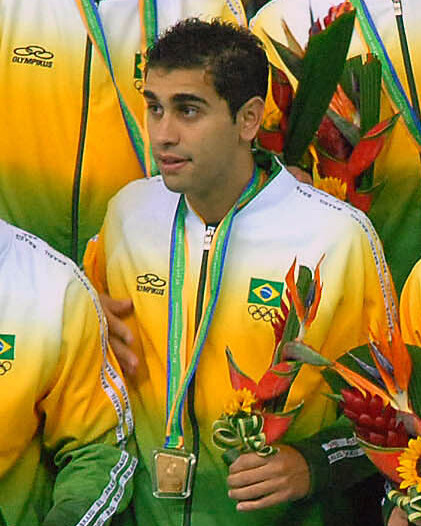
- Gabriel won a gold medal in Futsal at the 2007 Pan American Games in Rio de Janeiro

Personal information
- Full name: Gabriel da Silva Dias
- Date of birth: 17 November 1980 (age 45)
- Place of birth: Pelotas, Brazil
- Position: Forward

Senior career*
Years	Team	Apps	(Gls)
1999–2004	Carlos Barbosa		
2004–2011	Inter Movistar	234	(94)
2011–	Barcelona	40	(11)

International career
	Brazil	63	
- * Club domestic league appearances and goals

Gabriel da Silva Dias (born 17 November 1980), commonly known as Gabriel, is a Brazilian former futsal player who played for Barcelona and Inter Movistar as a flank. In his career, he won the UEFA Futsal Champions League four times, the FIFA Futsal World Cup two times and a gold medal in Futsal at the 2007 Pan American Games.

== Honours ==
- 2 FIFA Futsal World Cup (2008, 2012)
- 2 División de Honor (04/05, 07/08)
- 2 Copas de España (06/07, 08/09)
- 3 Supercopas de España (05/06, 07/08, 08/09)
- 4 UEFA Futsal Cup (2006, 2009, 2012, 2014)
- 6 Intercontinental Cup (2001, 2004, 2005, 2006, 2007, 2008)
- 1 Recopa de Europa (2008)
- 1 Copa Ibérica (05/06)
- 2 Liga Futsal (2001, 2004)
- 3 Ligas Estatales (1999, 2002, 2004)
- 1 Copa Brasil (2001)
- 2 South American Club Futsal Championship (2002, 2003)
- 2 Supercopa de América (2002, 2003)
- Gold medal in futsal at the 2007 Pan American Games
- 2 Campeonatos Sudamericanos (2006, 2008)
- 1 Grand Prix (2009)
