= Alex Martins =

Alex Martins may refer to:

- Alex Martins (basketball) (born 1964), American basketball executive
- Alex Martins (futsal player) (born 1980), Brazilian futsal player
- Alex Martins (footballer, born 1993), Brazilian football striker
