= 2012–13 Israeli Futsal League =

Israeli Futsal League
- Season: 2012–13
- Champions: ASA Ben-Gurion University
- Top goalscorer: 28 goals Ofir Levi (RLFC) / Golan Klimi (Mac. NI)

The 2012–13 season of the Israeli Futsal League was the 7th season of top-tier futsal under the Israel Football Association and 13th overall. The regular season started on 25 December 2012 and was concluded on 30 April 2013. The championship playoffs began on 6 May 2013 with semi-finals series and concluded with the championship final series, played on 13 and 19 May.

Maccabi Nahlat Itzhak Tel Aviv were the defending champions, but lost the title by losing to Rishon LeZion Futsal Club in the playoff semi-final. ASA Ben-Gurion University won the title by defeating Rishon LeZion in the play-off final.

== Format changes ==
With 6 clubs registered to play in the league, the clubs played each other in a triple round-robin tournament. At the end of the regular season, the top four teams qualified to the playoffs, while the two bottom teams competed for 5th place.

== Regular season table ==
Pos	Team	Pld	W	D	L	GF	GA	GD	Pts	Qualification or relegation
1	ASA Ben-Gurion University	15	13	0	2	70	41	+29	39	Championship playoffs
2	Rishon LeZion Futsal Club	15	9	1	5	86	75	+11	28	Championship playoffs
3	Maccabi Nahlat Itzhak Tel Aviv	15	8	2	5	80	61	+19	26	Championship playoffs
4	Yanshufei Agudat Sport Tel Aviv	15	7	4	4	83	51	+32	25	Championship playoffs
5	SC Rosh HaAyin/Petah Tikva	15	2	2	11	55	95	−40	8	5th place match
6	F.C. Hadera	15	1	1	13	62	114	−52	4	5th place match

Updated to match(es) played on 30 April 2013. Source: IFA – Futsal League

== Playoffs ==
=== Championship bracket ===
Semi-final
1	ASA Ben-Gurion	2	4	6
4	Yanshufei Tel Aviv	1	2	3
2	Rishon LeZion	5	3	8
3	Maccabi Nahlat Itzhak	4	3	7

Final
1	ASA Ben-Gurion	3	4	7
2	Rishon LeZion	0	2	2
3rd place
4	Yanshufei Tel Aviv	3	4	7
3	Maccabi Nahlat Itzhak	4	2	6

=== 5th place ===
5th place
5	SC Rosh HaAyin/Petah Tikva	11	1	4
6	F.C. Hadera	9	2	2

2012–13 Israeli Futsal League winners
ASA Ben-Gurion University
Second title
