= Bafodé Dansoko =

Guinean footballer (born 1995)

Personal information
- Date of birth: 28 December 1995 (age 30)
- Place of birth: Saint-Étienne, France
- Height: 1.87 m (6 ft 2 in)
- Position: Forward

Team information
- Current team: Shafa Baku
- Number: 18

Youth career
- 2003–2008: Hommelet CS
- 2008–2013: Wasquehal

Senior career*
Years	Team	Apps	(Gls)
2013–2014	Roubaix Futsal		
2014–2016	Nantes II	4	(0)
2016–2018	Wasquehal	26	(1)
2018–2019	Vaulx-en-Velin	12	(5)
2019–2020	La Louvière Centre	55	(23)
2020–2023	Deinze	68	(16)
2023–2025	Patro Eisden	55	(10)
2025–2026	Winterthur	21	(1)
2026–	Shafa Baku	6	(0)

International career^{‡}
2013–2014	France futsal U21		
2014–2015	France futsal		
2022–	Guinea	4	(0)
- * Club domestic league appearances and goals as of 18 September 2026 ‡ National team caps and goals as of 1 June 2023

Bafodé Dansoko (born 29 December 1995) is a professional footballer who plays as a forward for Azerbaijan Premier League side Shafa Baku. Born in France, he plays for the Guinea national team.

== Early life ==
Dansoko was born in Saint-Etienne, France, to Guinean parents.

== Club career ==
Dansoko was born in Saint-Étienne, France to a Guinean family as one of 6 children. He began playing football at the age of 8 with the youth academy of Hommelet CS, before moving to the youth side of Wasquehal 5 years later. He began playing futsal with Roubaix Futsal in 2013. He joined Nantes on trial in 2014 and signed a professional contract with the club starting in 2015.

Starting his footballing career with the reserves of Nantes, he shortly after moved to the semi-pro French clubs Wasquehal and Vaulx-en-Velin. He moved to Belgium with La Louvière Centre on 30 June 2018. On 9 June 2020, he signed a professional contract with Deinze. He made his professional debut with Deinze in a 2–0 Belgian First Division B loss to Union SG on 21 August 2020.

On 13 July 2023, Dansoko signed with Patro Eisden.

On 8 September 2025, he joined FC Winterthur in the Swiss Super League on a one-year deal with an option to extend.

== International career ==
Dansoko was born in France to a Guinean family. He was called up to represent the France futsal U21 team in 2013. Due to his strong performances with Roubaix Futsal, he was called up to the France national futsal team on 2014.

He debuted with the Guinea national team in a friendly 0–0 tie with South Africa on 25 March 2022.
