= 2013–14 Israeli Futsal League =

Israeli Futsal League
- Season: 2013–14
- Champions: ASA Ben-Gurion University
- Top goalscorer: 16 goals Shlomi Katzar (Ironi Petah Tikva)

The 2013–14 season of the Israeli Futsal League was the 8th season of top-tier futsal under the Israel Football Association and 14th overall. The regular season started on 1 March 2014 and was concluded on 3 May 2014. The championship playoffs began on 8 May 2014 with a semi-finals match and concluded with the championship final, played on 16 May.

ASA Ben-Gurion University, the defending champions, retained the title by defeating Rishon LeZion Futsal Club on penalties in the final.

== Format changes ==
With 8 clubs registered to play in the league, the clubs played each other in a single round-robin tournament. At the end of the regular season, the 2nd and 3rd placed teams played in a semi-final match, the winner meeting the top placed team in the final.

== Regular season table ==
Pos	Team	Pld	W	D	L	GF	GA	GD	Pts	Qualification or relegation
1	ASA Ben-Gurion University	7	6	0	1	53	19	+34	18	Playoff final
2	Yanshufei Agudat Sport Tel Aviv	7	5	2	0	42	23	+19	17	Playoff semi-final
3	Rishon LeZion Futsal Club	7	5	1	1	38	22	+16	16	Playoff semi-final
4	Maccabi Haifa	7	3	0	4	31	24	+7	9	
5	Hapoel Jerusalem	7	2	2	3	35	28	+7	8	
6	Maccabi Nahlat Itzhak Tel Aviv	7	2	1	4	31	30	+1	7	
7	Ironi Petah Tikva	7	2	0	5	26	44	−18	6	
8	Inter Tel Aviv	7	0	0	7	25	91	−66	0	

Updated to match(es) played on 3 May 2014. Source: IFA – Futsal League

== Playoffs ==
Semifinal			Final
			1	ASA Ben-Gurion	1 (3)
2	Yanshufel Tel Aviv	4	3	Rishon LeZion	1 (1)
3	Rishon LeZion	5

2013–14 Israeli Futsal League winners
ASA Ben-Gurion University
Third title
