= 2010–11 Israeli Futsal League =

Israeli Futsal League
- Season: 2010–11
- Champions: ASA Ben-Gurion University
- Top goalscorer: 62 goals Kfir Malul (Hapoel Ironi Rishon LeZion)

The 2010–11 season of the Israeli Futsal League was the 5th season of top-tier futsal under the Israel Football Association and 11th overall. The regular season started on 8 February 2011 and was concluded on 5 June 2011.

Yanshufei Agudat Sport Tel Aviv were the defending champions, but lost their title by losing in a deciding match to ASA Ben-Gurion University.

== Format changes ==
For this season, the 10 clubs registered to play in the league, played each other in a double round-robin tournament, with the top club winning the championship. As two teams finished equal on points and number of victories, a deciding match was needed to set the league champions.

== League table ==
Pos	Team	Pld	W	D	L	GF	GA	GD	Pts	Qualification or relegation
1	Yanshufei Agudat Sport Tel Aviv	18	16	1	1	206	44	+162	49	Deciding match
2	ASA Ben-Gurion University	18	16	1	1	168	42	+126	49	Deciding match
3	Hapoel Ironi Rishon LeZion	18	15	0	3	162	69	+93	45	
4	Ironi Petah Tikva	18	11	0	7	133	89	+44	33	
5	Hapoel Bnei Kafr Qasim	18	9	0	9	81	92	−11	27	
6	Maccabi Nahlat Itzhak Tel Aviv	18	7	1	10	100	113	−13	22	
7	Maccabi Dynamo Holon	18	5	1	12	131	179	−48	16	
8	Maccabi Tzur Shalom	18	4	1	13	81	159	−78	13	
9	SC Rosh HaAyin/Petah Tikva	18	3	1	14	92	205	−113	10	
10	Ramet Lod	18	1	0	17	79	241	−162	3	

Updated to match(es) played on 5 June 2011. Source: IFA – Futsal League

=== Deciding match ===
6 June 2011	Yanshufei Tel Aviv	4–6	ASA Ben-Gurion University	Ramat Gan
20:30	Ovadia 12'; Cohen 22', 36'; Degtiar 38'		Shriki 13', 19', 39'; Zisman 19' (pen.), 37'; Kalif 27'	Stadium: Zysman Arena; Referee: Erez Papir, Itzhak Cohen

2010–11 Israeli Futsal League winners
ASA Ben-Gurion University
First title
