= Sergey Sytin =

Ukrainian futsal player

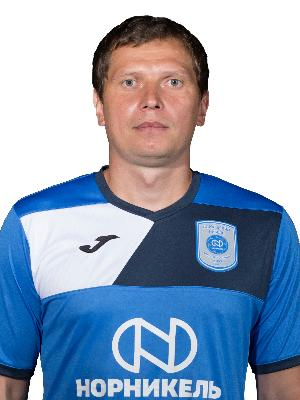

Personal information
- Date of birth: 19 July 1982 (age 44)
- Place of birth: Avdiivka, USSR
- Height: 1.74 m (5 ft 8 1/2 in)
- Position: Forward

Team information
- Current team: Dina Moscow
- Number: 20

Senior career*
Years	Team	Apps	(Gls)
1999–2001	Telecom	52	(13)
2002–2007	Shakhtar Donetsk	170	(149)
2007–2009	Spartak Schelkovo		
2009–	Dina Moscow	78	(37)

International career
2002–	Ukraine		
- * Club domestic league appearances and goals

Sergey Sytin (Ukr. Sergiy Valeriyovich Sitіn; born July 19, 1982, in Avdiivka, USSR) is a Ukrainian futsal player. He plays as a forward for the Moscow club Dina Moscow and played for the Ukrainian national futsal team.

== Biography ==
Graduate of Donetsk Sports School "Shakhtar". He started his futsal career in the Donetsk club "Telecom" and "Shakhtar", with the latter he became a four-time champion and a two-time winner of the Ukrainian Cup. In the 2006-07 season he was the best scorer of the Ukrainian League and the UEFA Futsal Cup. Then Sergey moved to the Russian Superleague club "Spartak-Schelkovo." Two seasons later he left the club due to financial problems and signed a contract with Dina Moscow. With the Ukrainian national futsal team he took part in three European championships (2003, 2005, 2007) and in one World Cup (2004). Sergey is European Championship silver medalist - 2003.

== Achievements ==
- Ukrainian Futsal League Champion (4): 2002, 2004, 2005, 2006
- Ukrainian Futsal Cup Winner (3): 2003, 2004, 2006
- UEFA Futsal Euro-2003 Vice-Champion (1): 2003
- Russian Futsal League Champion (1): 2014
