= 2008–09 Israeli Futsal League =

Israeli Futsal League
- Season: 2008–09
- Champions: Yanshufei Agudat Sport Tel Aviv
- Top goalscorer: 53 goals Shlomi Katzar (Ironi Petah Tikva)

The 2008–09 season of the Israeli Futsal League was the 3rd season of top-tier futsal under the Israel Football Association and 9th overall. The regular season started on 16 December 2008 and was concluded on 31 March 2009. The championship playoffs began on 7 April 2009 with semi-finals series and concluded with the championship final series from 6–14 May.

Hapoel Ironi Rishon LeZion were the defending champions but lost the title by losing to Yanshufei Agudat Sport Tel Aviv on goal difference in the 2008–09 Championship Final series.

== Regular season table ==
Pos	Team	Pld	W	D	L	GF	GA	GD	Pts	Qualification or relegation
1	Hapoel Ironi Rishon LeZion	14	11	2	1	85	45	+40	35	Qualification to the championship playoffs
2	Yanshufei Agudat Sport Tel Aviv	14	11	1	2	100	54	+46	34	Qualification to the championship playoffs
3	SC Rosh HaAyin/Petah Tikva	14	7	1	6	97	102	−5	22	Qualification to the championship playoffs
4	ASA Ben-Gurion University	14	6	1	7	63	51	+12	19	Qualification to the championship playoffs
5	Ironi Petah Tikva	14	5	1	8	92	85	+7	16	Qualification to the Bottom playoffs
6	Hapoel Bnei Kafr Qasim	14	4	1	9	89	106	−17	13	Qualification to the Bottom playoffs
7	Maccabi Tzur Shalom	14	4	1	9	86	105	−19	13	Qualification to the Bottom playoffs
8	Maccabi Dynamo Holon	14	4	0	10	73	137	−64	12	Qualification to the Bottom playoffs

Updated to match(es) played on 31 April 2009. Source: IFA – Futsal League

== Playoffs ==
=== Calendar ===
Round	Date	Fixtures	Clubs	Notes
Semifinals	7/21/26 April 2009	6	4 → 2	
Final	6/11/14 May 2009	3	2 → 1	

=== Bottom play-offs ===
Semifinals
5	Ironi Petah Tikva	9	12	21
8	Maccabi Dynamo Holon	11	8	2
6	Bnei Kafr Qasim	11	10
7	Maccabi Tzur Shalom	6	3

Final
5	Ironi Petah Tikva	10	11
2	Bnei Kafr Qasim	7	3

=== Championship play-offs ===
Semifinals
1	Hapoel Ironi R. LeZion	1	1	6
4	ASA Ben-Gurion University	0	1	5
2	Yanshufei Tel Aviv	8	8
3	SC Rosh HaAyin/P. Tikva	2	1

Final
1	Hapoel Ironi R. LeZion	5	1	6
2	Yanshufei Tel Aviv	4	1	8

2008–09 Israeli Futsal League winners
Yanshufei Agudat Sport Tel Aviv
First title
