= 2011–12 Israeli Futsal League =

Israeli Futsal League
- Season: 2011–12
- Champions: Maccabi Nahlat Itzhak Tel Aviv
- Top goalscorer: 39 goals Tzahi Ilos (F.C. Hadera)

The 2011–12 season of the Israeli Futsal League was the 6th season of top-tier futsal under the Israel Football Association and 12th overall. The regular season started on 26 December 2011 and was concluded on 24 March 2012. The championship playoffs began on 27 March 2012 with quarter-finals series and concluded with the championship final, played on 10 April.

ASA Ben-Gurion University were the defending champions, but lost the title by losing to Maccabi Nahlat Itzhak Tel Aviv in the playoff final.

== Format changes ==
With 8 clubs registered to play in the league, the clubs played each other in a double round-robin tournament, with all matches played in Amal School Hall in Hadera (home of basketball team Maccabi Hadera). At the end of the regular season, all teams qualified to the playoffs, with seeding determined by their regular season placing.

== Regular season table ==
Pos	Team	Pld	W	D	L	GF	GA	GD	Pts
1	ASA Ben-Gurion University	14	11	2	1	82	46	+36	35
2	Maccabi Nahlat Itzhak Tel Aviv	14	8	3	3	84	63	+21	27
3	Yanshufei Agudat Sport Tel Aviv	14	8	2	4	85	66	+19	26
4	Hapoel Ironi Rishon LeZion	14	7	3	4	77	65	+12	24
5	Maccabi Tzur Shalom	14	6	4	4	73	74	−1	22
6	SC Rosh HaAyin/Petah Tikva	14	3	3	8	65	80	−15	12
7	Hapoel Bnei Kafr Qasim	14	3	2	9	53	75	−22	11
8	Ironi Petah Tikva	14	0	1	13	39	89	−50	1

Updated to match(es) played on 24 March 2012. Source: IFA – Futsal League

== Playoffs ==
=== Championship bracket ===
Quarter finals
1	ASA Ben Gurion	10	4	14
8	Ironi Petah Tikva	1	1	2
4	Hapoel Ironi R. LeZion	3	3	6
5	F.C. Hadera	4	8	12
3	Yanshufei Tel Aviv	7	8	13?
6	SC Rosh HaAyin	7	8	15
2	Maccabi Nahlat Itzhak	6	7	13
7	Bnei Kafr Qasim	5	4	9

Semi finals
1	ASA Ben Gurion	4
5	F.C. Hadera	1
6	SC Rosh HaAyin	3
2	Maccabi Nahlat Itzhak	7

Finals
1	ASA Ben Gurion	3
2	Maccabi Nahlat Itzhak	4
Third place
5	F.C. Hadera	8
6	SC Rosh HaAyin	6

=== 5th to 8th place ===
Classification round
Ironi Petah Tikva	5 (2)
Hapoel Ironi R. LeZion	5 (4)
Yanshufei Tel Aviv	6
Bnei Kafr Qasim	8

5th place
Hapoel Ironi R. LeZion	8
Bnei Kafr Qasim	6
7th place
Ironi Petah Tikva	5
Yanshufei Tel Aviv	6

2011–12 Israeli Futsal League winners
Maccabi Nahlat Itzhak Tel Aviv
First title
