= 2008–09 UEFA Futsal Cup =

Tournament details
- Dates: 9 August 2008 – 26 April 2009
- Teams: 16 (Elite Round); 45 (Total)

Final positions
- Champions: (Spain) Inter FS
- Runners-up: (Russia) VIZ-Sinara Yekaterinburg

The 2008–09 UEFA Futsal Cup was the 23rd edition of Europe's premier club futsal tournament and the 8th edition under the current UEFA Futsal Cup format.

== Teams ==
Final round
(Russia) Viz-Sinara Yekaterinburg	(Russia) Dinamo Moskva	(Kazakhstan) AFC Kairat	(Spain) Inter FS
Main round
Preliminary round

== Preliminary round ==
=== Group A ===
- Palacium, Villeneuve d'Ascq– (France)

Team	Pts	Pld	W	D	L	GF	GA
(France) Roubaix Futsal	7	3	2	1	0	20	7
(Cyprus) Parnassos	7	3	2	1	0	24	14
(Armenia) Polytechnic Yerevan	3	3	1	0	2	9	19
(Iceland) Viðir Garður	0	3	0	0	3	11	24

Roubaix	4–4	Parnassos
Polytechnic Yerevan	4–3	Viðir Garður
Roubaix	9–2	Vidir Gardur
Parnassos	9–4	Polytechnic Yerevan
Viðir Garður	6–11	Parnassos
Polytechnic Yerevan	1–7	Roubaix

=== Group B ===
- Eisstadion, Hart bei Graz– (Austria)

Team	Pts	Pld	W	D	L	GF	GA
(Latvia) Nikars Riga	9	3	3	0	0	19	13
(Austria) 1. FSC Graz	6	3	2	0	1	14	10
(Switzerland) Seefeld Zurich	3	3	1	0	2	10	15
(Andorra) Madriu	0	3	0	0	3	3	8

1. FSC Graz	4–1	Madriu
Nikars Riga	10–6	Seefeld Zurich
Madriu	1–2	Nikars Riga
1. FSC Graz	4–2	Seefeld Zurich
Seefeld Zurich	2–1	Madriu
Nikars Riga	7–6	1. FSC Graz

=== Gruppo C ===
- Winter Palace Sport Hall–Sofia (Bulgaria)

Team	Pts	Pld	W	D	L	GF	GA
(Bulgaria) Nadin Sofia	6	2	2	0	0	15	10
(North Macedonia) Elita Tetovo	3	2	1	0	1	6	7
(England) Ipswich Wolves	0	2	0	0	2	10	14

Nadin Sofia	10–8	Ipswich Wolves
Ipswich Wolves	2–4	Elita Tetovo
Elita Tetovo	2–5	Nadin Sofia

=== Group D ===
- S.Darius & S.Girenas Sport Center, Kaunas– (Lithuania)

Team	Pts	Pld	W	D	L	GF	GA
(Lithuania) Nautara Kaunas	9	3	3	0	0	14	9
(Moldova) Dinamo Chişinău	6	3	2	0	1	21	12
(Albania) Tirana	1	3	0	1	2	10	17
(Denmark) Albertslund IF	1	3	0	1	2	7	14

Tirana	2–2	Albertslund IF
Nautara Kaunas	5–3	Dinamo Chişinău
Dinamo Chişinău	9–4	Tirana
Nautara Kaunas	3–2	Albertslund IF
Albertslund IF	3–9	Dinamo Chişinău
Tirana	4-6	Nautara Kaunas

=== Group E ===
- Pasila Sport Hall, Helsinki– (Finland)

Team	Pts	Pld	W	D	L	GF	GA
(Slovenia) Gorica	9	3	3	0	0	17	3
(Finland) Golden Futsal Team	6	3	2	0	1	14	6
(Republic of Ireland) St. Patrick's Athletic	3	3	1	0	2	8	14
(Malta) Scandals Futsal Club	0	3	0	0	3	5	21

Golden	7–2	St.Patrick's
Gorica	11–0	Scandals
Golden	6–2	Scandals
St.Patrick's	2–4	Gorica
Scandals	3–4	St. Patrick's
Gorica	2–1	Golden

=== Group F ===
- Sport Halle Am Berg Fidel, Münster– (Germany)

Team	Pts	Pld	W	D	L	GF	GA
(Netherlands) Carillon Boys B.	9	3	3	0	0	29	2
(Germany) UFC Münster	6	3	2	0	1	10	11
(Estonia) FC Betoon Tallinn	3	3	1	0	2	6	17
(Bosnia and Herzegovina) Orlić Sarajevo	0	3	0	0	3	0	15

Orlić Sarajevo	0–5	Betoon
Munster	2–10	Beverwijk
Beverwijk	5–0	Orlić Sarajevo
Munster	3–1	Betoon
Betoon	0–14	Beverwijk
Orlić Sarajevo	0–5	Munster

== Main round ==
=== Group 1 ===
- Pljevlja– (Montenegro)

Team	Pts	Pld	W	D	L	GF	GA
(Portugal) Benfica	9	3	3	0	0	16	2
(Slovenia) Gorica	4	3	1	1	1	8	6
(Montenegro) Municipium Pljevlja	4	3	1	1	1	7	10
(Greece) Athina 90	0	3	0	0	3	0	13

=== Group 2 ===
- Gliwice– (Poland)

Team	Pts	Pld	W	D	L	GF	GA
(Italy) Luparense	9	3	3	0	0	17	3
(Serbia) Ekonomac Kragujevac	4	3	1	1	1	10	9
(Poland) P.A. Nova Gliwice	4	3	1	1	1	11	14
(Latvia) Nikars Riga	0	3	0	0	3	6	18

=== Group 3 ===
- Odorheiu Secuiesc– (Romania)

Team	Pts	Pld	W	D	L	GF	GA
(Belgium) Action 21 Charleroi	7	3	2	1	0	20	4
(Romania) Odorheiu Secuiesc	7	3	2	1	0	10	6
(Belarus) Viten Orsha	3	3	1	0	2	4	8
(France) Roubaix Futsal	0	3	0	0	3	5	21

=== Group 4 ===
- Debrecen– (Hungary)

Team	Pts	Pld	W	D	L	GF	GA
(Ukraine) Shakhtar Donetsk	7	3	2	1	0	16	5
(Croatia) Hmnk Gospić	7	3	2	1	0	10	4
(Netherlands) Carillon Boys B.	3	3	1	0	2	2	7
(Hungary) Mezei-Vill FC	0	3	0	0	3	2	14

=== Group 5 ===
- Chrudim– (Czech Republic)

Team	Pts	Pld	W	D	L	GF	GA
(Czech Republic) Era-Pack Chrudim	7	3	2	1	0	14	6
(Israel) Hapoel Ironi R.L.	5	3	1	2	0	7	6
(Georgia (country)) Iberia 2003 Tbilisi	3	3	1	0	2	12	12
(Lithuania) Nautara Kaunas	1	3	0	1	2	6	15

=== Group 6 ===
- Nakhchivan– (Azerbaijan)

Team	Pts	Pld	W	D	L	GF	GA
(Azerbaijan) Araz Naxçivan	9	3	3	0	0	21	5
(Slovakia) Slov-Matic Bratislava	6	3	2	0	1	16	6
(Bulgaria) Nadin Sofia	3	3	1	0	2	5	15
(Sweden) Skövde AIK	0	3	0	0	3	5	21

== Elite round ==
=== Group A ===
Team	Pts	Pld	W	D	L	GF	GA
(Russia) Viz-Sinara Yekaterinburg	9	3	3	0	0	12	7
(Italy) Luparense	6	3	2	0	1	10	9
(Ukraine) Shakhtar Donetsk	3	3	1	0	1	12	8
(Slovakia) Slov-Matic Bratislava	0	3	0	0	2	4	14

Shakhtar Donetsk	7–1	Slov-Matic Bratislava
Viz-Sinara Yekaterinburg	5–3	Luparense
Luparense	3–2	Shakhtar Donetsk
Viz-Sinara Yekaterinburg	3–1	Slov-Matic Bratislava
Slov-Matic Bratislava	2–4	Luparense
Shakhtar Donetsk	3–4	Viz-Sinara Yekaterinburg

=== Group B ===
Team	Pts	Pld	W	D	L	GF	GA
(Kazakhstan) AFC Kairat	7	3	2	1	0	12	7
(Belgium) Action 21 Charleroi	7	3	2	1	0	10	7
(Czech Republic) Era-Pack Chrudim	3	3	1	0	2	12	10
(Slovenia) Gorica	0	3	0	0	3	4	14

Kairat	4–1	Gorica
Action 21 Charleroi	4–2	Era-Pack Chrudim
Era-Pack Chrudim	2–4	Kairat
Action 21 Charleroi	2–1	Gorica
Gorica	2–8	Era-Pack Chrudim
Kairat	4–4	Action 21 Charleroi

=== Group C ===
Team	Pts	Pld	W	D	L	GF	GA
(Russia) Dinamo Moskva	9	3	3	0	0	13	5
(Azerbaijan) Araz Naxçivan	6	3	2	0	1	12	11
(Croatia) Nacional Zagreb	3	3	1	0	2	8	12
(Romania) Odorheiu Secuiesc	0	3	0	0	3	10	15

Dinamo Moskva	4–3	Odorheiu Secuiesc
Nacional Zagreb	3–4	Araz Naxçivan
Araz Naxçivan	2–4	Dinamo Moskva
Nacional Zagreb	5–3	Odorheiu Secuiesc
Odorheiu Secuiesc	4–6	Araz Naxçivan
Dinamo Moskva	5–3	Nacional Zagreb

=== Group D ===
Team	Pts	Pld	W	D	L	GF	GA
(Spain) Inter FS	9	3	3	0	0	17	3
(Portugal) Benfica	6	3	2	0	1	17	4
(Serbia) Ekonomac	1	3	0	1	2	6	17
(Israel) Hapoel Ironi R.L.	1	3	0	1	2	6	22

Inter FS	5–1	Ekonomac
Benfica	8–1	Hapoel Ironi R.L.
Hapoel Ironi R.L.	1–10	Inter FS
Benfica	8–1	Ekonomac
Ekonomac	4–4	Hapoel Ironi R.L.
Inter FS	2–1	Benfica

== Final four ==
=== Semifinal ===
24 April 2009	AFC Kairat	0–5	Inter FS	Palace of Sports, Yekaterinburg
13.00		Report	01'51" Schumacher; 07'33" Schumacher; 17'21" Neto; 27'51" Neto; 35'01" Bácaro

24 April 2009	Viz-Sinara Yekaterinburg	2–0	Dinamo Moskva	Palace of Sports, Yekaterinburg
15.00	35'05" Mokhov; 36'14" Chistopolov

=== Final 3rd and 4th ===
26 April 2009	AFC Kairat	1–0	Dinamo Moskva	Palace of Sports, Yekaterinburg
14.30	02'32" Carlinhos

== Final ==
The 2009 UEFA Futsal Cup Final was played at 17:00 CET on 26 April 2009 at the Palace of Sports in Yekaterinburg, Russia. Inter FS won the match 5–1.

26 April 2009	Viz-Sinara Yekaterinburg	1–5	Inter FS	Palace of Sports, Yekaterinburg
17:00	35'33" Agapov	Report	07'37" Daniel; 09'46" Jordi Torras; 12'35" (rig.) Schumacher; 35'01" Daniel; 38'06" Juanra	Attendance: 4300

UEFA Futsal Cup
2008–09 Winners

Inter FS
3rd Title
