= 2009–10 Israeli Futsal League =

Israeli Futsal League
- Season: 2009–10
- Champions: Yanshufei Agudat Sport Tel Aviv
- Top goalscorer: 22 goals Shlomi Katzar (Ironi Petah Tikva)

The 2009–10 season of the Israeli Futsal League was the 4th season of top-tier futsal under the Israel Football Association and 10th overall. The regular season started on 24 February 2010 and was concluded on 7 April 2010. The championship playoffs began on 14 April 2010 with semi-finals series and concluded with the championship final series, played on 11 and 12 May.

Yanshufei Agudat Sport Tel Aviv were the defending champions and retained the title by beating Hapoel Ironi Rishon LeZion in the 2009–10 Championship Final series.

== Format changes ==
With 10 clubs registered to play in the league, the clubs were split into two groups with 5 teams in each, which played each other once. The top 4 teams in each group qualified to the championship play-offs, while the bottom clubs played for 9th place.

== Regular season table ==
=== Group A ===
Pos	Team	Pld	W	D	L	GF	GA	GD	Pts	Qualification or relegation
1	Yanshufei Agudat Sport Tel Aviv	4	4	0	0	27	12	+15	12	Championship playoffs
2	ASA Ben-Gurion University	4	2	0	2	18	12	+6	6	Championship playoffs
3	Ironi Petah Tikva	4	2	0	2	20	22	−2	6	Championship playoffs
4	Maccabi Tzur Shalom	4	1	0	3	20	29	−9	3	Championship playoffs
5	Maccabi Nahlat Itzhak Tel Aviv	4	1	0	3	16	26	−10	3	9th place match

Updated to match(es) played on 7 April 2010. Source: IFA – Futsal League

=== Group B ===
Pos	Team	Pld	W	D	L	GF	GA	GD	Pts	Qualification or relegation
1	Hapoel Ironi Rishon LeZion	4	4	0	0	30	17	+13	12	Championship playoffs
2	SC Rosh HaAyin/Petah Tikva	4	3	0	1	36	19	+17	9	Championship playoffs
3	Maccabi Dynamo Holon	4	2	0	2	27	27	0	6	Championship playoffs
4	Hapoel Bnei Kafr Qasim	4	1	0	3	16	24	−8	3	Championship playoffs
5	Beitar Ironi Ariel (futsal)	4	0	0	4	17	39	−22	0	9th place match

Updated to match(es) played on 7 April 2010. Source: IFA – Futsal League

== Playoffs ==
=== Championship bracket ===
Quarter finals
A1	Yanshufei Tel Aviv	7	11	18
B4	Bnei Kafr Qasim	5	1	6
A2	ASA B. Gurion University	6	7	13
B3	Maccabi Dynamo Holon	2	8	10
A3	Ironi Petah Tikva	2	3	4
B2	SC Rosh HaAyin/P. Tikva	4	9	13
A4	Maccabi Tzur Shalom	0	2	2
B1	Hapoel Ironi R. LeZion	8	10	18

Semi finals
A1	Yanshufei Tel Aviv	5	7	12
A2	ASA B. Gurion University	1	3	4
B2	SC Rosh HaAyin/P. Tikva	3	3	6
B1	Hapoel Ironi R. LeZion	5	3	8

Finals
A1	Yanshufei Tel Aviv	4	8	12
B1	Hapoel Ironi R. LeZion	2	0	2
Third place
A2	ASA B. Gurion University	8	5	13
B2	SC Rosh HaAyin/P. Tikva	3	6	9

=== 5th to 8th place ===
Classification round
A3	Ironi Petah Tikva	7	10	17
B4	Bnei Kafr Qasim	9	2	11
A4	Maccabi Tzur Shalom	9	7	16
B3	Maccabi Dynamo Holon	6	11	17

5th place
A3	Ironi Petah Tikva	6	8	14
B3	Maccabi Dynamo Holon	8	4	12
7th place
B4	Bnei Kafr Qasim	1	4	5
A4	Maccabi Tzur Shalom	3	1	4

=== 9th place match ===
9th place
A5	Maccabi Nahlat Itzhak	9	9	8
B5	Beitar Ironi Ariel	5	12	3

2009–10 Israeli Futsal League winners
Yanshufei Agudat Sport Tel Aviv
Second title
