= Alex Martins (futsal player) =

Brazilian futsal player

Personal information
- Full name: Alex Almeida Martins
- Date of birth: 17 April 1980 (age 46)
- Place of birth: Guanhães, Brazil
- Height: 1.71 m (5 ft 7 in)
- Positions: Winger; Pivot

Senior career*
Years	Team	Apps	(Gls)
–2002	Kickers Charleroi		
2002–2003	Action 21		
2003–2004	Kickers Charleroi		
2004–2006	Action 21		
2006–2007	Norilsk Nickel		
2007–2015	Sporting CP	243	(190)
2015–2016	Baku United		
- * Club domestic league appearances and goals as of 00:00, 2 June 2019 (UTC) ‡ National team caps and goals as of 00:00, 2 June 2019 (UTC)

Alex Almeida Martins (born 17 April 1980) is a Brazilian former futsal player who played as a winger and pivot. Throughout his career Alex won three Belgian league titles and the 2004–05 UEFA Futsal Cup with Belgian side Action 21 and four Portuguese league titles with Sporting CP. He also scored a total of 40 goals in the UEFA Futsal Cup, making him one of the most prolific goalscorers in the continent's top competition.

== Honours ==
Action 21

- Belgian Division 1 (3): 2002–03, 2004–05, 2005–06
- UEFA Futsal Cup: 2004–05

Sporting CP

- Liga Portuguesa (4): 2009–10, 2010–11, 2012–13, 2013–14
- Taça de Portugal (3): 2007–08, 2010–11, 2012–13
- Supertaça de Portugal (4): 2008, 2010, 2013, 2014
- Taça de Honra AF Lisboa: 2013
