= César Muñoz (futsal player) =

Spanish futsal player

Personal information
- Full name: César Muñoz Martín-Calvo
- Date of birth: 19 July 1975 (age 51)
- Place of birth: Madrid, Spain
- Position: Defender

Senior career*
Years	Team	Apps	(Gls)
1991–96	Marsanz		
1996–03	Caja Segovia		
2003–04	Dinamo Moskva		
2003–04	Playas de Castellón		
2004–09	Lobelle		
2009–10	Luparense		
2010–11	Inter Movistar		

International career
¿?–	Spain	1	
- * Club domestic league appearances and goals

César Muñoz Martín-Calvo (born 19 July 1975), commonly known as César, is a former Spanish futsal player who played as a defender.

== Honors ==
- 1 Recopa de Europa (06/07)
- 1 División de Honor de Futsal (99/00)
- 4 Copa de España de Futsal (1998, 1999, 2000, 2006)
- 4 Supercopa de España de Futsal (1994, 1998, 1999 y 2000)
- 1 Futsal European Clubs Championship (2000)
- 2 Intercontinental Futsal Cup (2000, 2011)
- 1 Copa Xunta de Galicia (2005)
