= Damir Khamadiyev =

Russian futsal player

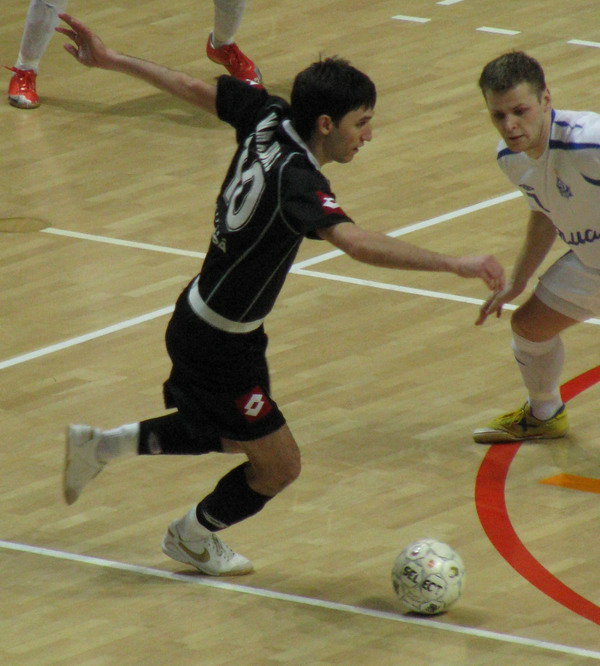
- Damir Hamadiev in 2010

Personal information
- Date of birth: 30 July 1981 (age 45)
- Place of birth: Sverdlovsk, USSR
- Height: 1.74 m (5 ft 8 1/2 in)
- Position: universal

Team information
- Current team: Dina Moscow
- Number: 25

Senior career*
Years	Team	Apps	(Gls)
1998–2002	Finpromco Alpha		
2002–2011	Sinara		
2011–	Dina Moscow		

International career
2002–	Russia	48	(23)
- * Club domestic league appearances and goals

Damir Darvisovich Khamadiyev (born July 30, 1981 in Sverdlovsk, USSR) is a Russian futsal player who plays for Dina Moscow and the Russian national futsal team as a universal. Famous for many games as a part of the Yekaterinburg club "Sinara".

== Biography ==
Khamadiyev was born in Sverdlovsk in a Tatar family. Up to 15 years Damir practised football, then decided to switch to futsal. In 2002, Damir moved to the Ekaterinburg club "Viz-Sinara”. As a part of the Russian national team he won medals of UEFA Futsal Championship. In 2007, Khamadiyev again won the Russian Cup, and a year later he helped "Viz-Sinara" on the way to the first European success - victory in the UEFA Futsal Cup. Afterwards Damir twice won Russian championship as a member of the Yekaterinburg club.

In summer 2011 Khamadiyev moved to the Moscow club Dina Moscow.

== Achievements ==
- UEFA Futsal European Championship silver medalist (1): 2005
- UEFA Futsal European Championship bronze medalist (1): 2007
- FIFA Futsal World Cup semifinalist (1): 2008
- Student FIFA Futsal World Cup Winner (2): 2002, 2006
- UEFA Futsal Cup Winner (1): 2007-08
- Russian Futsal Championship Winner (3): 2009, 2010, 2014
- Russian Futsal Cup Winner (2): 2001, 2007
