= Topdivisie =

- Founded: 1968
- Country: Netherlands
- Confederation: UEFA
- Number of clubs: 12
- Level on pyramid: 1
- International cup: UEFA Futsal Cup
- Current champions: Tigers Roemond
- Current: Current Season at UEFA.com

The Topdivisie is the premier futsal league in the Netherlands, organized by the Royal Dutch Football Association.

== Champions ==
| Season | Winner |
|---|---|
| 1968/1969 | Scagha '66 Schagen |
| 1969/1970 | Van Wissen Sport Eindhoven |
| 1970/1971 | Dio '30 Druten |
| 1971/1972 | Hovocubo Hoorn |
| 1972/1973 | Velocitas/KMA Breda |
| 1973/1974 | Scagha '66 Schagen |
| 1974/1975 | Scagha '66 Schagen |
| 1975/1976 | Hovocubo Hoorn |
| 1976/1977 | FC Nathania Arnhem |
| 1977/1978 | FC Nathania Arnhem |
| 1978/1979 | Intervent Volendam |
| 1979/1980 | Marco-Fit Eindhoven |
| 1980/1981 | Makelardij Klomp Lunteren |
| 1981/1982 | Hovocubo Hoorn |
| 1982/1983 | De Haantjes Beek |
| 1983/1984 | FC Kras Boys Volendam |
| 1984/1985 | In De Drei Kreuninge Maastricht |
| 1985/1986 | FC Kras Boys Volendam |
| 1986/1987 | FC Kras Boys Volendam |
| 1987/1988 | ZVV Ceverbo Dordrecht |
| 1988/1989 | Bax Zeefdrukkerij Voorhout |
| 1989/1990 | Depa Wijchen |
| 1990/1991 | Rex Volendam |
| 1991/1992 | Depa Wijchen |
| 1992/1993 | 't Hoornsche Veerhuys |
| 1993/1994 | Schoenenreus Veghel |
| 1994/1995 | Bunga Melati Tilburg |
| 1995/1996 | 't Hoornsche Veerhuys |
| 1996/1997 | Kanjers Bunga Melati Tilburg |
| 1997/1998 | Kanjers Bunga Melati Tilburg |
| 1998/1999 | Den Haag/Trimeur |
| 1999/2000 | HV/SCN |
| 2000/2001 | Den Haag/Trimeur |
| 2001/2002 | FCK De Hommel |
| 2002/2003 | West Stars Futsal |
| 2003/2004 | FC Marlene |
| 2004/2005 | FCK De Hommel |
| 2005/2006 | FC Marlene |
| 2006/2007 | FCK De Hommel |
| 2007/2008 | Blok Carillon Boys |
| 2008/2009 | FC Marlene |
| 2009/10 | CF Eindhoven |
| 2010/11 | CF Eindhoven |
| 2011/12 | CF Eindhoven |
| 2012/13 | CF Eindhoven |
| 2013/14 | Hovocubo |
| 2014/15 | CF Eindhoven |
| 2015/16 | asv Lebo |
| 2016/17 | 't Knooppunt |
| 2017/18 | Hovocubo |
| 2018/19 | Hovocubo |
| 2019/20 | Abandoned due to the COVID-19 pandemic |
| 2020/21 | Abandoned due to the COVID-19 pandemic |
| 2021/22 | Hovocubo |
| 2022/23 | CF Eindhoven |
| 2023/24 | Tigers Roemond |
| 2024/25 | Tigers Roemond |
| 2025/26 | Tigers Roemond |
