= Bulgarian Premiere Futsal League =

- Founded: 2002
- Country: Bulgaria
- Confederation: UEFA
- Number of clubs: 10
- Level on pyramid: 1
- Domestic cup: Bulgarian Futsal Cup
- International cup: UEFA Futsal Cup
- Current champions: Amigo Northwest
- Current: Current Season at UEFA.com

Bulgarian Premiere Futsal League is the premier futsal league in Bulgaria.

== Champions ==
Season	Winner
2002–03	Delfini Varna
2003–04	MAG Varna
2004–05	S.C. Piccadilly Varna
2005–06	Mladost Sofia
2006–07	S.C. Piccadilly Varna
2007–08	Nadin Sofia
2008–09	MFC Varna
2009–10	Levski Sofia Zapad
2010–11	MFC Varna
2011–12	FC Grand Pro Varna
2012–13	FC Grand Pro Varna
2013–14	FC Grand Pro Varna
2014–15	FC Grand Pro Varna
2015–16	FC Grand Pro Varna
2016–17	Levski Sofia Zapad
2017–18	Varna City
2018–19	Varna City
2019–20	Cherno More Varna
2020–21	Varna City
2021–22	Amigo Northwest
2022–23	Amigo Northwest
2023–24	Amigo Northwest
2024–25	Cherno More Varna
2025–26	Amigo Northwest

== Teams for 2008/2009 season ==
- FC Nadin
- FC Akademika
- FK G Sofia
- FSC Levski Sofia West
- MFC Varna
- FC Odesos
- FC MAG
- FC Vekta
- FC Mirineks
- FC Moni
