= FC Marlène =

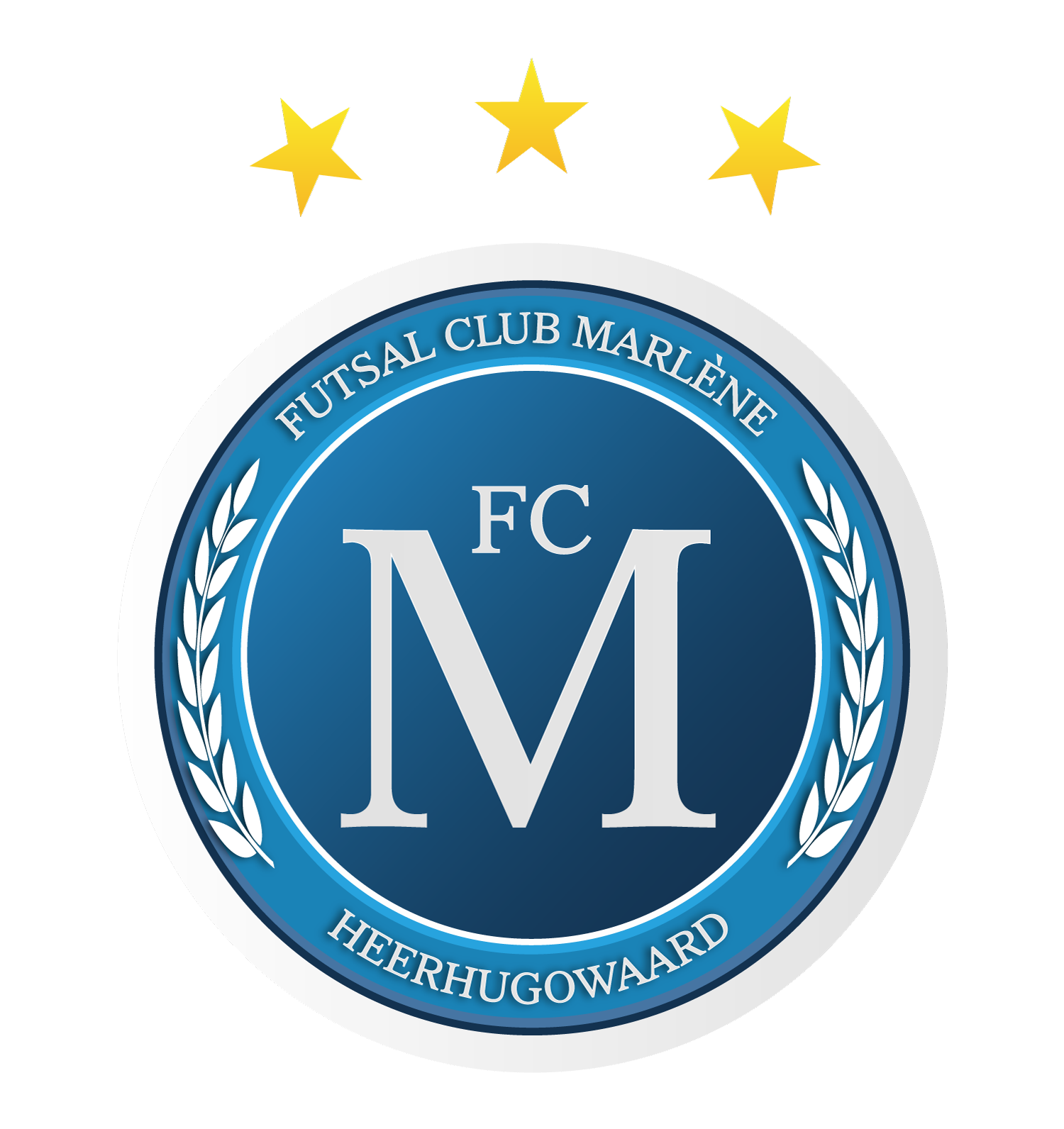
- Full name: FC Marlène
- Founded: 1973
- Ground: Heerhugowaard, Netherlands
- Capacity: unknown
- League: Topdivisie
- 2008-09: Topdivisie, 1st
Home colours	Away colours

FC Marlène is a futsal club based in Heerhugowaard, Netherlands.

== Squad 2009-2010 ==
Note: Flags indicate national team as defined under FIFA eligibility rules; some limited exceptions apply. Players may hold more than one non-FIFA nationality.

No.	Pos.	Nation	Player
1	G	NED	Peter Rozenbeek
3	G	NED	Joep Grden
4	G	NED	Dennis Selbach
5	G	NED	Kees Thies
6	G	NED	Tom Hofkamp
7	G	NED	Jeroen Kossen
9	G	NED	Amir Molkârâl

No.	Pos.	Nation	Player
10	G	NED	Rachid El Kaddouri
11	G	NED	Roy Huisman
12	G	NED	Gerjan Stet
14	G	NED	Sander De Zwart
15	G	NED	Bas Adrianus Nicolaas Duijs
16	G	NED	Mats Velseboer
22	G	NED	Wesley Haanraads

== Honours ==
- 3 Topdivisie: 2004, 2006, 2009
- 5 Dutch Futsal Cup: 2004, 2005, 2006, 2007, 2009
- 2 Dutch Futsal Super Cup: 2005, 2006, 2008
