= Tonota F.C. =

Tonota FC is a football club based in Tonota, Botswana. The club competes in the Botswana football league and represent the village of Tonota and surrounding communities

Tonota F.C. was established in 2006 and spent much of its history competing in the lower divisions of Botswana football.in the 2025-26 season , the club won the First Division championship and secured promotion to Botswana's top division for the first time in its history.
