= César Paulo =

Brazilian futsal player

Personal information
- Full name: César Paulo Lopes Cardoso Campos
- Date of birth: 15 January 1979 (age 47)
- Place of birth: Brasília, Brazil
- Height: 1.82 m (5 ft 11 1/2 in)
- Position: Pivot

Senior career*
Years	Team	Apps	(Gls)
2001–2005	Banespa		
2005–2006	Benicarló		
2006–2007	→ Farroupilhense (loan)		
2008–2013	Benfica		
2013–2014	Intelli		
2014	Carlos Barbosa		
2015	Era-Pack Chrudim		

International career
	Brazil	20	(25)
- * Club domestic league appearances and goals

César Paulo Lopes Cardoso Campos (born 15 January 1979) is a Brazilian former futsal player who last played for Era-Pack Chrudim as a pivot.

== Career ==
Born in Brasília, Paulo professional career started in Esporte Clube Banespa, helping the club win the Copa Libertadores de Futsal in 2001, by beating Carlos Barbosa in the final. He spent the next four years competing for the São Paulo team, before he made his first move to Europe.

He joined FS Baix Maestrat, in the small town of Benicarló, in the Valencian Community, but did not have much success, as the Spanish side finished in a club record low, fourteen place, in the 2005-06 season. They had to play a play-off with Las Rozas Boadilla, which ended in controversy. Paulo was then loaned to Associação Farroupilhense de Futsal for one year.

On 21 January 2008, the Brazilian pivot signed with Benfica. and quickly became a fan favorite. He was nicknamed O Imperador (The Emperor), winning back-to-back league titles in his first two years, plus another continental title in the following season, the 2009–10 UEFA Futsal Cup.

After three more seasons, which included a league and cup double in 2012, the 34-year-old returned to Brazil and signed with Intelli. In the Orlândia team, he won another league title, and his third continental title, the 2013 Copa de Libertadores.

Paulo moved clubs again on 21 December 2013, joining Associação Carlos Barbosa. but spent only one season, making a third move to Europe in February 2015, to play in the Czech league for Era-Pack Chrudim.

== Honours ==
Banespa

- Copa Libertadores de Futsal: 2001

Benfica

- UEFA Futsal Cup: 2009–10
- Liga Portuguesa: 2007–08, 2008–09, 2011–12
- Taça de Portugal: 2008–09, 2011–12
- Supertaça de Portugal: 2009, 2011, 2012

Intelli

- Copa Libertadores de Futsal: 2013
- Liga Futsal: 2013
