= FC MAG =

Futsal team based in Varna, Bulgaria

- Founded: 1997
- Ground: Vladislav Arena, Varna, Bulgaria
- Capacity: 600
- Manager: Todor Kamenov
- League: Bulgarian Futsal Championship
Home colours

FC MAG is a futsal team based in Varna, Bulgaria. It plays in Bulgarian Futsal Championship. The club was officially founded in 1997 and refounded in 2003. Club colors are blue and white.

== Achievements ==
- Champions of Bulgaria: 1 time (2004)

== Current Squad 2008/09 ==
#		Name	Age	Last Club
0	(Bulgaria)	Anton Filipov (GK)
	(Bulgaria)	Kaloyan Dimitrov
	(Bulgaria)	Yavor Sofroniev
	(Bulgaria)	Todor Kamenov
	(Bulgaria)	Hristo Dimitrov
	(Bulgaria)	Valentin Stanchev
