= FC Grand Pro Varna =

MFC Varna
- Full name: FC Grand Pro Varna
- Founded: 2 October 2003
- Dissolved: 2011
- Ground: Vladislav Arena, Varna
- Manager: Veselin Branimirov
- League: Bulgarian Futsal Championship
- 2007/08: 2nd
- Website: https://web.archive.org/web/20081202024805/http://mfcvarna.bg/
Home colours	Away colours

FC Grand Pro Varna was a professional futsal team based in Varna, Bulgaria. It played in the Bulgarian Futsal Championship. The club was officially founded in 2003 under the name Piccadilly. In 2007 the club called MFC Varna. The club colors are yellow, red and black.

In 2011 MFC Varna became the champion of Bulgaria for the third time, but after unsuccessful participation in the qualifying rounds of the Champions League, at the end of August 2011, the club was officially dissolved.

== Achievements ==
- Champions of Bulgaria: 3 times (2005, 2007, 2009)
- Winner of Bulgarian futsal cup: 3 times (2006, 2008, 2009)

== Current Squad 2008/09 ==
Note: Flags indicate national team as defined under FIFA eligibility rules; some limited exceptions apply. Players may hold more than one non-FIFA nationality.

No.	Pos.	Nation	Player
1	GK	BUL	Ismet Hadzhiev
2		BUL	Viktor Viktorov
3		BUL	Boycho Marev
4		BUL	Boris Trendafilov
6		BUL	Pavel Pavlov
10		BUL	Vladimir Gochev
12		BUL	Georgi Georgiev
13		BUL	Anton Atanasov
21		BUL	Ivaylo Borisov
22		BUL	Blagovest Marev
33	GK	BUL	Stanislav Ivanov
