= Roubaix Futsal =

- Full name: Roubaix Futsal
- Founded: 2003
- Ground: Salle Raymond Dubly, Roubaix, France
- Capacity: 300
- Chairman: Messaoud Ferkioui
- Manager: Nordine Benamrouche
- League: Championnat de France
Home colours	Away colours

Roubaix Futsal is a futsal team from Roubaix, France, played in the Championnat de France de Futsal.

== Palmares ==
- 1 Challenge National de Futsal: 2007/08
- 3 Coupe Nationale de Futsal: 2005, 2006, 2008
