= AFC Kairat =

Kazakh football club

- Full name: Kairat Almaty Futsal Club
- Founded: 1995; 31 years ago
- Ground: Kairat Sport Complex, Almaty
- Chairman: Kairat Orazbekov
- Manager: Marlon Velasco Heras (Spain)
- League: Kazakhstan Futsal Premier League
- 2021–22: 1
Home colours	Away colours

AFC Kairat (Kazakh: Қайрат Алматы футзал клубы, Qaırat Almaty fýtzal klýby) is a professional futsal club based in Almaty, the biggest city of Kazakhstan. The club was founded in 1995. Since 2012 the club has been one of the strongest teams in Europe, having reached UEFA Futsal Cup semi-finals four times and winning it in 2012–13 and 2014–15 seasons.

== History ==
The club was founded in 1995 under the name "Kainur". And in the winter of 1996, immediately won the championship of Kazakhstan. Further successes of Alma-Ata were Cups of Kazakhstan (finalists 1997, semifinalists 1998 and finally - owners of the Cup in 1999 and 2000). Success in the RK championship came to the club only after its renaming into "Kairat" in 2003/04 season. The club became the champion of Kazakhstan 19 times in a row in the seasons 2004-2022. This success Almaty achieved with the help of Brazilian legionnaires, who were added to the team in the future. Kairat also switched to the practice of attracting Brazilian coaches: Paulo Augusto, Faisal Saab, Jose Alesio, Barbosa, Kakau now Kaka.

In the middle of 2005/06 season "Kairat" was involved in a scandal with the Karaganda team "Tulpar", withdrawn in February from the championship. According to the president of the Karaganda club Anatoly Smotritsky, "Tulpar" was biased referees and management of the futsal department, lobbying the interests of "Kairat

In 2012 Kairat won its first Super Cup of Kazakhstan. A year earlier it lost on aggregate of two matches to Karaganda Tulpar.

"Kairat" debuted in the UEFA Futsal Cup in the season 2004/05. Already in the next draw Almatians managed to reach the semifinals, where they lost to Dynamo Moscow.

During the draw of 2007/08 year "Kairat" again was among the four strongest clubs in Europe, and a year later managed to become the bronze medalist of the tournament, beating in the match for third place, the already familiar "Dinamo-Yamal".

In the 2009/10 season Almaty lost a ticket to the Final Four Azerbaijani "Araz", but managed to win it a season later. Then "Kairat" managed to achieve the right to take the Final Four in Almaty. In the semifinals, he faced Sporting of Portugal. With the support of their fans, the Almaty team was as close as ever to reach the final, but again stopped one step away from him, losing with a score of 2:3. Then, in the match for third place, "Kairat" repeated the achievement of a year before last and defeated (3-3 and 5-3 in a penalty shootout) Portuguese "Benfica", became the bronze medalist of the tournament.

In the 2012/2013 season Kairat, with a new coach Brazilian Kaka, still made it. Once again reached the Final Four, which was held in Tbilisi (Georgia), the Almaty club beat reigning Cup winner Barcelona (5-4) in the semifinals and defeated Dynamo Moscow (4-3) in the final.

In the 2014/2015 season Almaty "Kairat" in Lisbon (Portugal) in the final beat Spanish "Barcelona" (3-2), and became a two-time winner of the UEFA Futsal Cup.

In the 2016/2017 draw, which took place April 28–30, 2017 in Alma-Ata, Kairat became the first club to host the Final Four for the second time. In the semifinals, it lost to future winner Inter Movistar of Spain (2-3), but won bronze medals against last year's winner, Russian club Gazprom-Yugra (5-5, 3-2 on penalties).

In March 2018, Kairat won the Yeremenko Cup for the third consecutive time and the fourth of five draws. After that tournament, the longtime coach of the team, Brazilian Cacao (Ricardo Camara Sobral) announced his departure.

Then Kaka came and became the head coach of AFC Kairat and the Kazakhstan national team.

In 2019, Almaty broke the UEFA Cup record, 12,090 attendance.

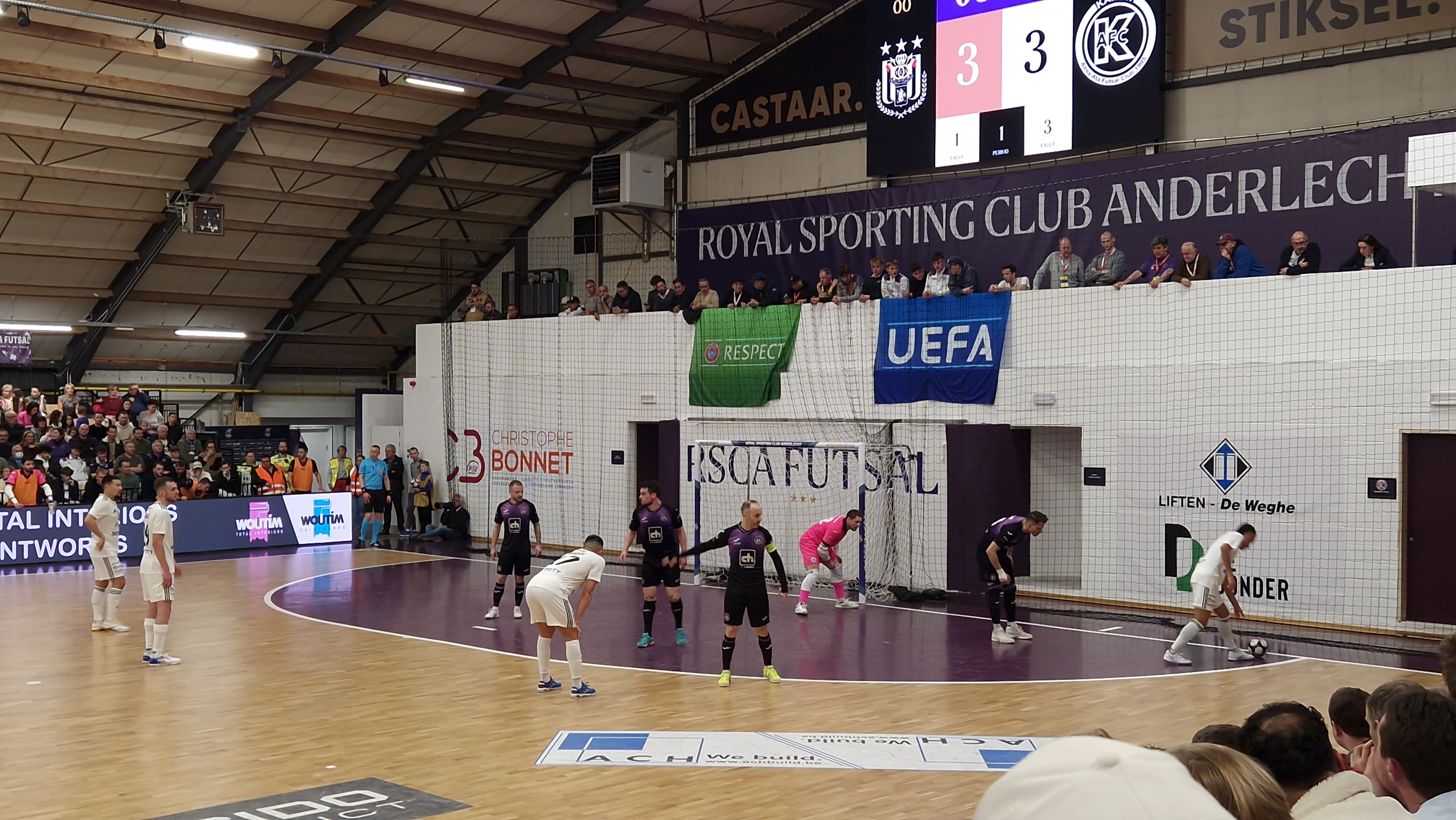
Kairat away game against Anderlecht during the 2025–26 UEFA Champions League

The team managed to reach the 2024–25 UEFA Futsal Champions League final in Le Mans, but lost 4–9 to Palma Futsal.

== Achievements ==
- Intercontinental Futsal Cup
  - Winner (1): 2014
- UEFA Futsal Cup
  - Winner (2): 2012–13, 2014–15
  - Runner-up (1): 2018-19
  - Third place (5): 2005–06, 2008–09, 2010–11, 2016–17, 2020–21
- Kazakhstan Futsal Premier League: 18
  - 2003–04, 2004–05, 2005–06, 2006–07, 2007–08, 2008–09, 2009–10, 2010–11, 2011–12, 2012–13, 2013–14, 2014–15, 2015–16, 2016–17, 2017–18, 2018–19, 2019–20, 2020–21
- Kazakhstan Cup: 17
  - 1999–2000, 2000–01, 2004–05, 2005–06, 2006–07, 2007–08, 2008–09, 2009–10, 2012–13, 2013–14, 2014–15, 2015–16, 2016–17, 2017–18, 2018–19, 2019–20, 2020-21

== Current squad ==
As of 5 December 2021

#	Position	Name	Nationality
16	Goalkeeper	Narun Serikov	(Kazakhstan)
2	Goalkeeper	Leo Higuita	(Kazakhstan)
6	Defender	Edson Santos	(Brazil)
7	Winger	Rangel Pereira	(Brazil)
8	Forward	Savio Valadares	(Romania)
9	Pivot	Albert Akbalikov	(Kazakhstan)
11	Winger	Diego Fávero	(Brazil)
12	Pivot	Dauren Tursagulov	(Kazakhstan)
13	Forward	Vitao	(Brazil)
14	Defender	Douglas Júnior	(Kazakhstan)
16	Defender	Dauren Nurgozhin	(Kazakhstan)
17	Winger	Birzhan Orazov	(Kazakhstan)
10	Universal	Chingiz Yesenamanov	(Kazakhstan)
20	Forward	Turekhan Dossov	(Kazakhstan)
23	Forward	Yerzhan Karmenov	(Kazakhstan)
