= Daniel Ibañes =

Spanishfutsal player

Daniel
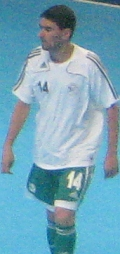

Personal information
- Full name: Daniel Ibañes Caetano
- Date of birth: 6 July 1976 (age 50)
- Place of birth: São Paulo, Brazil
- Position: Ala

Senior career*
Years	Team	Apps	(Gls)
1991	XV de Piracicaba		
1991	Tejusa		
1994	Osan		
1995	Tejusa		
1995–1996	Mejorada		
1996–2002	Caja Segovia		
2002–2010	Inter Movistar		

International career
	Spain	108	
- * Club domestic league appearances and goals

Daniel Ibañes Caetano (born 6 July 1976) is a former futsal player, best known for his spell with Inter Movistar as an Ala. Born in Brazil, he plays for the Spain national futsal team.

== Honours ==
- 5 League Championships (98/99, 02/03, 03/04, 04/05, 07/08)
- 7 Cup Championships (97/98, 98/99, 99/00, 03/04, 04/05, 06/07, 08/09)
- 8 Supercups of Spain (97/98, 98/99, 99/00, 01/02, 03/04, 05/06, 07/08, 08/09)
- 3 UEFA Futsal Cups (2000, 2004, 2006)
- 5 Intercontinental Cups (2000, 2005, 2006, 2007, 2008)
- 1 Recopa of Europe (2008)
- 2 cups Iberian (03/04, 05/06)
- 1 World Championship (Guatemala 2000)
- 1 runner World Cup (Brazil 2008)
- 4 European Championships (Russia 2001, Czech 2005, Portugal 2007, Hungria 2010)
- 1 Having chosen Best Player of the LNFS (98/99)
- 2 times voted best right wing LNFS (98/99, 01/02)
- 1 Having chosen Best of the Ala-Pivot LNFS (04/05)
- 1 time top scorer of the LNFS (01/02)
- Voted Best Player of the Third World (Guatemala 00)
- UEFA Futsal Cup top scorer (99/00)
- UEFA Futsal Cup Best Player (99/00)
