= Action 21 Charleroi =

Action 21
- Full name: Action 21 Charleroi
- Founded: 1999
- Dissolved: 2015
- Ground: Complexe sportif de la Garenne, Charleroi, Belgium
- Capacity: 3,000
- Chairman: --
- Manager: --
- League: Division 1
- 2008-09: Division 1, 1st
| Home colours | Away colours |

Action 21 Charleroi was a futsal club based in Charleroi, Belgium.

== History ==
The club was founded in 1999, Charleroi Garenne and FCS Sambreville merged in Action 21 Charleroi. Because of insufficient money, they merged with "FC Chatelineau" and became "Charleroi 21"

== Squad 2009/2010 ==
Note: Flags indicate national team as defined under FIFA eligibility rules; some limited exceptions apply. Players may hold more than one non-FIFA nationality.

| No. | Pos. | Nation | Player |
|---|---|---|---|
| 1 | G | BEL | Anthony Tognini |
| 2 | G | BEL | Valentin Dujacquier |
| 3 | G | BEL | Thomas Liuzzi |
| 4 | G | BEL | Jonathan Fosse |
| 6 | G | BEL | Michael Piazza |
| 7 | G | BEL | Aiyoub Anik |
| 8 | G | BEL | Lúcio Rosa |

| No. | Pos. | Nation | Player |
|---|---|---|---|
| 9 | G | BEL | Mario Lunetta |
| 10 | G | BRA | Liliu Carvalho |
| 12 | G | BEL | Filippo La Rocca |
| 14 | G | BEL | Sebastien Deswijsen |
| 18 | G | BEL | Julien Rizzo |
| 22 | G | BEL | Sebastiano Canaris |

== Palmares ==
=== Domestic ===
- 10 Division 1 (10): 1999/00, 2000/01, 2001/02, 2002/03, 2003/04, 2004/05, 2005/06, 2007/08, 2008/09, 2009/10
- 4 Belgian Cup (4): 2003/04, 2004/05, 2005/06, 2006/07
- 8 Belgian Supercup (8): 2000/01, 2001/02, 2002/03, 2003/04, 2004/05, 2005/06, 2006/07, 2008/09

=== International ===
- UEFA Futsal Champions League (1): 2004/05
  - UEFA Futsal Champions League runners-up (2):2: 2001/02, 2002/03
- 2 Benelux Cups (2): 2001/02, 2002/03
