= 2015–16 UEFA Futsal Cup =

Tournament details
- Dates: Qualifying rounds: 25 August – 15 November 2015; Final tournament: 22–24 April 2016
- Teams: Final tournament: 4 Total: 49 (from 48 associations)

Final positions
- Champions: (Russia) Gazprom-Ugra Yugorsk (1st title)
- Runners-up: (Spain) Inter FS
- Third place: (Portugal) Benfica
- Fourth place: (Italy) ASD Pescara

Tournament statistics
- Matches played: 103
- Goals scored: 735 (7.14 per match)
- Top scorer: (Russia) Eder Lima (13 goals)

The 2015–16 UEFA Futsal Cup was the 30th edition of Europe's premier club futsal tournament, and the 15th edition under the current UEFA Futsal Cup format organized by UEFA.

Kairat Almaty were the defending champions, but were eliminated in the elite round. In the final, Gazprom-Ugra Yugorsk defeated Inter FS to become the third Russian team, after MFK Dinamo Moskva and MFK Viz-Sinara Yekaterinburg, to win the title.

== Teams ==
A total of 49 teams from 48 of the 54 UEFA member associations entered the tournament, which included first-time entrants from Luxembourg. Each association could enter one team. Moreover, the winners of the 2014–15 UEFA Futsal Cup, Kairat Almaty, qualified automatically as title holders, and thus their association, Kazakhstan, could enter a second team.

Teams were ranked according to their UEFA coefficients, computed based on results of the last three seasons, to decide on the round they entered. The top four teams (with the title holders being the automatic top seed) entered the elite round, the next 16 teams (ranked 5–20) entered the main round, and the bottom 29 teams (ranked 21–49) entered the preliminary round.

For teams entering the preliminary round or main round, they were assigned a seeding position according to their ranking for the respective draw, with eight teams pre-selected as hosts for the preliminary round and six teams pre-selected as hosts for the main round (marked by (H) below).

Rank	Association	Team	Coeff
Elite round
1	Kazakhstan	Kairat Almaty (Title holders)	64.167
2	Spain	Inter FS	29.666
3	Kazakhstan	Tulpar Karagandy	28.500
4	Serbia	Ekonomac Kragujevac	21.000
Main round
Seeding position 1
5	(Czech Republic) Czech Republic	FK EP Chrudim	19.500
6	Russia	Gazprom-Ugra Yugorsk	18.500
7	Slovakia	Slov-Matic Bratislava (H)	17.501
8	Hungary	Győri ETO FC (H)	16.167
9	Ukraine	FC Lokomotiv Kharkiv	15.500
10	Portugal	Benfica	14.667
Seeding position 2
11	Latvia	FK Nikars Riga (H)	14.000
12	England	Baku United FC	10.167
13	Netherlands	Futsal Club Eindhoven	8.000
14	Romania	City'US Târgu Mureș (H)	7.833
15	Bulgaria	FC Grand Pro Varna	7.374
16	(Georgia (country)) Georgia	Georgians Tbilisi	5.834
Seeding position 3
17	Belarus	LSM Lida	5.334
18	Slovenia	Dobovec (H)	5.000
19	Cyprus	FC APOEL Nicosia (H)	4.500
20	Greece	Athina '90	4.500

Rank	Association	Team	Coeff
Preliminary round
Seeding position 1
21	France	Kremlin-Bicêtre United	4.417
22	Croatia	FC National Zagreb	4.167
23	(North Macedonia) Macedonia	KMF Železarec Skopje (H)	3.750
24	Italy	ASD Pescara	3.667
25	Belgium	FP Halle-Gooik	3.250
26	(Bosnia and Herzegovina) Bosnia and Herzegovina	MNK Centar Sarajevo	3.167
27	Germany	Hamburg Panthers	2.000
28	Norway	Grorud IL	1.833
Seeding position 2
29	Moldova	FC Progress Chișinău (H)	1.625
30	Andorra	FC Encamp (H)	1.499
31	(Republic of Ireland) Republic of Ireland	Blue Magic FC Dublin	1.250
32	Israel	ASA Ben Gurion	1.084
33	Austria	Stella Rossa Wien (H)	1.000
34	Sweden	Futsal Club Göteborg	1.000
35	Finland	Sievi Futsal	0.917
36	Albania	KF Flamurtari Vlorë	0.917
Seeding position 3
37	Denmark	JB Futsal Gentofte	0.833
38	Iceland	Víkingur Ólafsvík (H)	0.750
39	Turkey	Istanbul Üniversitesi SK	0.750
40	Montenegro	KMF Titograd (H)	0.584
41	Switzerland	Mobulu Futsal Uni Bern (H)	0.500
42	Estonia	SK Augur Tallinn	0.500
43	Armenia	ASUE Futsal	0.417
44	Scotland	FC Santos Perth	0.251
Seeding position 4
45	Malta	Luxol Futsal	0.250
46	Lithuania	FC Inkaras	0.167
47	Gibraltar	Lynx FC (H)	0.084
48	Wales	Cardiff University Futsal Club	0.000
49	Luxembourg	FC Differdange 03	0.000

Did not enter
Azerbaijan
(Faroe Islands) Faroe Islands
Liechtenstein
(Northern Ireland) Northern Ireland
Poland
(San Marino) San Marino

The draws for the preliminary round and main round were held on 2 July 2015, 13:30 CEST (UTC+2), at the UEFA headquarters in Nyon, Switzerland. The mechanism of the draws for each round is as follows:

- In the preliminary round, the 29 teams were drawn into eight groups, either of four containing one team from each of the seeding positions 1–4, or of three containing one team from each of the seeding positions 1–3. First, the eight teams which were pre-selected as hosts were drawn from their own designated pot and allocated to their respective group as per their seeding positions. Next, the remaining 21 teams were drawn from their respective pot which were allocated according to their seeding positions.
- In the main round, the 24 teams were drawn into six groups of four, either containing one team from each of the seeding positions 1–3 and one group winner from the preliminary round, or containing one team from each of the seeding positions 1–2 and two group winners from the preliminary round. First, the six teams which were pre-selected as hosts were drawn from their own designated pot and allocated to their respective group as per their seeding positions. Next, the remaining 18 teams (including the eight preliminary round winners, whose identity was not known at the time of the draw) were drawn from their respective pot which were allocated according to their seeding positions.

== Round and draw dates ==
The schedule of the competition was as follows.

Round	Draw	Dates
Preliminary round	2 July 2015	25–29 August 2015
Main round	2 July 2015	29 September–4 October 2015
Elite round	14 October 2015	10–15 November 2015
Final tournament	15 March 2016	Semi-finals: 22 April 2016; Third place match & Final: 24 April 2016

== Format ==
In the preliminary round, main round and elite round, each group was played as a round-robin mini-tournament at the pre-selected hosts.

In the final tournament, the four qualified teams played in knockout format (semi-finals, third place match, and final), either at a host selected by UEFA from one of the teams, or at a neutral venue.

=== Tiebreakers ===
In the preliminary round, main round and elite round, the teams were ranked according to points (3 points for a win, 1 point for a draw, 0 points for a loss). If two or more teams were equal on points on completion of a mini-tournament, the following tie-breaking criteria were applied, in the order given, to determine the rankings (regulations Articles 14.01 and 14.02):

1. Higher number of points obtained in the mini-tournament matches played among the teams in question;
2. Superior goal difference resulting from the mini-tournament matches played among the teams in question;
3. Higher number of goals scored in the mini-tournament matches played among the teams in question;
4. If, after having applied criteria 1 to 3, teams still had an equal ranking, criteria 1 to 3 were reapplied exclusively to the mini-tournament matches between the teams in question to determine their final rankings. If this procedure did not lead to a decision, criteria 5 to 10 applied;
5. Superior goal difference in all mini-tournament matches;
6. Higher number of goals scored in all mini-tournament matches;
7. If only two teams had the same number of points, and they were tied according to criteria 1 to 6 after having met in the last round of the mini-tournament, their rankings were determined by a penalty shoot-out (not used if more than two teams had the same number of points, or if their rankings were not relevant for qualification for the next stage).
8. Lower disciplinary points total based only on yellow and red cards received in the mini-tournament matches (red card = 3 points, yellow card = 1 point, expulsion for two yellow cards in one match = 3 points);
9. Coefficient ranking;
10. Drawing of lots.

== Preliminary round ==
The eight group winners advanced to the main round to join the 16 teams which received byes to the main round.

All times were CEST (UTC+2).

=== Group A ===
Pos	Team	Pld	W	D	L	GF	GA	GD	Pts	Qualification
1	(France) Kremlin-Bicêtre United	3	3	0	0	12	1	+11	9	Main round
2	(Austria) Stella Rossa Wien (H)	3	2	0	1	7	5	+2	6	
3	(Turkey) Istanbul Üniversitesi SK	3	1	0	2	8	7	+1	3	
4	(Lithuania) FC Inkaras	3	0	0	3	3	17	−14	0	

Source: UEFA
Rules for classification: Tiebreakers
(H) Hosts
25 August 2015
18:45

Kremlin-Bicêtre United (France)	7–1	(Lithuania) FC Inkaras
Vita Nzaka 3' (pen.); Rondon 24', 36'; Francois 26', 39'; A. Mohammed 27' (pen.); Juanillo 31'	Report	A. Juozaitis 27'

Hollgasse Hall, Vienna
Referee: Elchin Samadli (Azerbaijan), Viktor Bugenko (Moldova)
25 August 2015
21:00

Stella Rossa Wien (Austria)	3–2	(Turkey) Istanbul Üniversitesi SK
Lalić 8', 38'; Vojnović 32'	Report	Altunay 7'; Bildirici 10'

Hollgasse Hall, Vienna
Referee: Trayan Enchev (Bulgaria), Cjapi Kreshnik (Albania)

26 August 2015
18:45

Istanbul Üniversitesi SK (Turkey)	0–3	(France) Kremlin-Bicêtre United
	Report	A. Mohammed 23'; Rondon 33'; Belhaj 35'

Hollgasse Hall, Vienna
Referee: Viktor Bugenko (Moldova), Kreshnik Hakrama (Albania)
26 August 2015
21:00

Stella Rossa Wien (Austria)	4–1	(Lithuania) FC Inkaras
Lalić 9'; Dervišević 19' (pen.), 26'; Sapardić 32'	Report	A. Juozaitis 16'

Hollgasse Hall, Vienna
Referee: Elchin Samadli (Azerbaijan), Trayan Enchev (Bulgaria)

28 August 2015
18:45

FC Inkaras (Lithuania)	1–6	(Turkey) Istanbul Üniversitesi SK
Bakus 9'	Report	Petkevičius 2' (o.g.); Altunay 4', 12'; Gezener 6'; Yenilmez 29'; Açikel 34'

Hollgasse Hall, Vienna
Referee: Kreshnik Hakrama (Albania), Elchin Samadli (Azerbaijan)
28 August 2015
21:00

Kremlin-Bicêtre United (France)	2–0	(Austria) Stella Rossa Wien
A. Mohammed 28'; Juanillo 40'	Report

Hollgasse Hall, Vienna
Referee: Trayan Enchev (Bulgaria), Viktor Bugenko (Moldova)

=== Group B ===
Pos	Team	Pld	W	D	L	GF	GA	GD	Pts	Qualification
1	(Italy) ASD Pescara	3	3	0	0	18	0	+18	9	Main round
2	(Denmark) JB Futsal Gentofte	3	1	1	1	8	10	−2	4	
3	(Malta) Luxol Futsal	3	1	1	1	10	17	−7	4	
4	(Andorra) FC Encamp (H)	3	0	0	3	5	14	−9	0	

Source: UEFA
Rules for classification: Tiebreakers
(H) Hosts
26 August 2015
18:00

ASD Pescara (Italy)	9–0	(Malta) Luxol Futsal
Canal 1'; Rogerio da Silva 8', 8', 39'; Gréllo 9'; Despotović 10' (o.g.); Caputo 14'; Cuzzolino 21' (pen.); Zammit 34' (o.g.)	Report

Centre Esportiu Serradells, Andorra la Vella
Referee: Andrej Topić (Croatia), David Schaerli (Switzerland)
26 August 2015
20:30

FC Encamp (Andorra)	2–3	(Denmark) JB Futsal Gentofte
Llamas 26'; Moises Ferreira 39'	Report	Jørgensen 4'; Kjaer 31'; Larsen 37'

Centre Esportiu Serradells, Andorra la Vella
Referee: Josip Barton (Macedonia), Zoran Sofrenić (Bosnia and Herzegovina)

27 August 2015
18:00

JB Futsal Gentofte (Denmark)	0–3	(Italy) ASD Pescara
	Report	Salas 13'; Canal 15', 19'

Centre Esportiu Serradells, Andorra la Vella
Referee: Zoran Sofrenić (Bosnia and Herzegovina), Andrej Topić (Croatia)
27 August 2015
20:30

FC Encamp (Andorra)	3–5	(Malta) Luxol Futsal
Moises Ferreira 14'; A. Férriz 39', 40'	Report	Bonello 2', 28'; Augusto 37'; Barbosa 38' (pen.); Anton 38'

Centre Esportiu Serradells, Andorra la Vella
Referee: David Schaerli (Switzerland), Josip Barton (Macedonia)

29 August 2015
18:00

Luxol Futsal (Malta)	5–5	(Denmark) JB Futsal Gentofte
Anton 15'; Despotović 17'; Barbosa 20', 35', 38'	Report	Jørgensen 4', 5'; Badran 10'; Jensen 12'; El-Ouaz 12'

Centre Esportiu Serradells, Andorra la Vella
Referee: Josip Barton (Macedonia), Andrej Topić (Croatia)
29 August 2015
20:30

ASD Pescara (Italy)	6–0	(Andorra) FC Encamp
Cuzzolino 4'; Leggiero 13'; Nicolodi 17', 18'; Caputo 32'; Gréllo 36'	Report

Centre Esportiu Serradells, Andorra la Vella
Referee: David Schaerli (Switzerland), Zoran Sofrenić (Bosnia and Herzegovina)

=== Group C ===
Pos	Team	Pld	W	D	L	GF	GA	GD	Pts	Qualification
1	(Croatia) FC National Zagreb	3	3	0	0	30	1	+29	9	Main round
2	(Montenegro) KMF Titograd (H)	3	2	0	1	9	6	+3	6	
3	(Republic of Ireland) Blue Magic FC Dublin	3	1	0	2	3	21	−18	3	
4	(Wales) Cardiff University Futsal Club	3	0	0	3	2	16	−14	0	

Source: UEFA
Rules for classification: Tiebreakers
(H) Hosts
26 August 2015
18:00

FC National Zagreb (Croatia)	11–0	(Wales) Cardiff University Futsal Club
Grbeša 3'; Kocić 8', 39'; Koturović 11', 19', 25', 26'; Kubović 15', 31'; Surudžić 17'; Jamičić 32'	Report

Morača Sports Center, Podgorica
Referee: Vasilios Christodoulis (Greece), Alejandro Martínez Flores (Spain)
26 August 2015
20:30

KMF Titograd (Montenegro)	5–1	(Republic of Ireland) Blue Magic FC Dublin
Barović 1'; M. Bajčetić 6'; Tomović 10'; Bojanović 28'; Kowaluk 37' (o.g.)	Report	Adamczyk 39' (pen.)

Morača Sports Center, Podgorica
Referee: Peter Nurse (England), Patrik Porkert (Austria)

27 August 2015
18:00

Blue Magic FC Dublin (Republic of Ireland)	0–15	(Croatia) FC National Zagreb
	Report	Kocić 2', 13', 24'; Ofiara 7' (o.g.); Matošević 7', 35'; Grbeša 9'; Koturović 10'; Musteață 14' (o.g.); Kubović 18'; Novak 19', 25'; Banek 26'; Jamičić 27'; Reis 27' (o.g.)

Morača Sports Center, Podgorica
Referee: Alejandro Martínez Flores (Spain), Peter Nurse (England)
27 August 2015
20:30

KMF Titograd (Montenegro)	3–1	(Wales) Cardiff University Futsal Club
Barović 11'; M. Bajčetić 20'; Bojanović 22'	Report	Hugh 32'

Morača Sports Center, Podgorica
Referee: Patrik Porkert (Austria), Vasilios Christodoulis (Greece)

29 August 2015
18:00

Cardiff University Futsal Club (Wales)	1–2	(Republic of Ireland) Blue Magic FC Dublin
Zulkarnain 36'	Report	Musteață 32'; Rocha 35'

Morača Sports Center, Podgorica
Referee: Vasilios Christodoulis (Greece), Patrik Porkert (Austria)
29 August 2015
20:30

FC National Zagreb (Croatia)	4–1	(Montenegro) KMF Titograd
Kocić 4'; Surudžić 9'; Grbeša 17' (pen.), 22'	Report	Bojanović 3'

Morača Sports Center, Podgorica
Referee: Alejandro Martínez Flores (Spain), Peter Nurse (England)

=== Group D ===
Pos	Team	Pld	W	D	L	GF	GA	GD	Pts	Qualification
1	(Finland) Sievi Futsal	3	3	0	0	21	6	+15	9	Main round
2	(Norway) Grorud IL	3	1	1	1	12	11	+1	4	
3	(Gibraltar) Lynx FC (H)	3	1	1	1	14	16	−2	4	
4	(Scotland) FC Santos Perth	3	0	0	3	5	19	−14	0	

Source: UEFA
Rules for classification: Tiebreakers
(H) Hosts
26 August 2015
16:30

Grorud IL (Norway)	6–0	(Scotland) FC Santos Perth
El Moussaoui 8', 19'; Obeng 15', 40'; Jafar 31'; Akinyemi 40' (pen.)	Report

Tercentenary Sports Hall, Gibraltar
Referee: Nicola Manzione (Italy), Andrzej Witkowski (Poland)
26 August 2015
19:00

Lynx FC (Gibraltar)	3–8	(Finland) Sievi Futsal
Bernal 12', 28', 34'	Report	Tirkkonen 5', 31'; Pakola 7', 20'; Junno 7', 12'; Ja. Alasuutari 32'; Hosio 35'

Tercentenary Sports Hall, Gibraltar
Referee: Aleksandras Sliva (Lithuania), Valentin Ciuplea (Wales)

27 August 2015
16:30

Sievi Futsal (Finland)	7–2	(Norway) Grorud IL
Hosio 3', 7', 21'; Tirkkonen 4'; Ju. Alasuutari 10'; Pakola 13'; Junno 40'	Report	Svendsen 1'; Akinyemi 29'

Tercentenary Sports Hall, Gibraltar
Referee: Andrzej Witkowski (Poland), Nicola Manzione (Italy)
27 August 2015
19:00

Lynx FC (Gibraltar)	7–4	(Scotland) FC Santos Perth
Sanchez 1'; Vargas 16' (pen.); Bernal 24'; J. Duarte 31', 32'; Corbacho 33' (pen.), 35'	Report	Davis 7', 20', 26' (pen.); Mollison 19' (pen.)

Tercentenary Sports Hall, Gibraltar
Referee: Valentin Ciuplea (Wales), Aleksandras Sliva (Lithuania)

29 August 2015
16:30

FC Santos Perth (Scotland)	1–6	(Finland) Sievi Futsal
Mollison 21'	Report	Pakola 26', 40' (pen.); Akhmetkhanov 28'; Tirkkonen 38', 39', 39'

Tercentenary Sports Hall, Gibraltar
Referee: Nicola Manzione (Italy), Valentin Ciuplea (Wales)
29 August 2015
19:00

Grorud IL (Norway)	4–4	(Gibraltar) Lynx FC
Akinyemi 3', 37'; Jafar 17', 31'	Report	J. Duarte 21'; Martin 22'; Vargas 36', 40'

Tercentenary Sports Hall, Gibraltar
Referee: Aleksandras Sliva (Lithuania), Andrzej Witkowski (Poland)

=== Group E ===
Pos	Team	Pld	W	D	L	GF	GA	GD	Pts	Qualification
1	(Germany) Hamburg Panthers	3	3	0	0	14	5	+9	9	Main round
2	(Albania) KF Flamurtari Vlorë	3	2	0	1	8	6	+2	6	
3	(Iceland) Víkingur Ólafsvík (H)	3	1	0	2	12	15	−3	3	
4	(Luxembourg) FC Differdange 03	3	0	0	3	9	17	−8	0	

Source: UEFA
Rules for classification: Tiebreakers
(H) Hosts
25 August 2015
19:00

Hamburg Panthers (Germany)	6–2	(Luxembourg) FC Differdange 03
Winkel 21', 32'; Meyer 31'; Khalili 36'; De La Cuesta 38'; J. Teixeira 40' (o.g.)	Report	A. Teixeira 7', 32'

Ithrottahus Snæfellsbæjar, Ólafsvík
Referee: Veljko Bošković (Montenegro), Kaspars Kivlišs (Latvia)
25 August 2015
21:30

Víkingur Ólafsvík (Iceland)	1–5	(Albania) KF Flamurtari Vlorë
Turudija 35' (pen.)	Report	Kočović 11', 18', 25'; Alović 25'; Bllumbi 28'

Ithrottahus Snæfellsbæjar, Ólafsvík
Referee: Barry Weijers (Netherlands), Guy Berger (Israel)

26 August 2015
19:00

KF Flamurtari Vlorë (Albania)	0–3	(Germany) Hamburg Panthers
	Report	Winkel 30'; Meyer 35'; Ulusoy 40'

Ithrottahus Snæfellsbæjar, Ólafsvík
Referee: Veljko Bošković (Montenegro), Barry Weijers (Netherlands)
26 August 2015
21:30

Víkingur Ólafsvík (Iceland)	8–5	(Luxembourg) FC Differdange 03
William 1'; Tokić 8', 29'; Turudija 8', 40'; Łuba 29'; Eggertsson 35'; Stefánsson 40'	Report	Chalmandier 5', 38'; Cardoso 27'; Fernandes 36', 37'

Ithrottahus Snæfellsbæjar, Ólafsvík
Referee: Kaspars Kivlišs (Latvia), Guy Berger (Israel)

28 August 2015
19:00

FC Differdange 03 (Luxembourg)	2–3	(Albania) KF Flamurtari Vlorë
A. Teixeira 34'; Chalmandier 40'	Report	Kočović 8', 39'; Bllumbi 30'

Ithrottahus Snæfellsbæjar, Ólafsvík
Referee: Guy Berger (Israel), Kaspars Kivlišs (Latvia)
28 August 2015
21:30

Hamburg Panthers (Germany)	5–3	(Iceland) Víkingur Ólafsvík
Labiadh 24', 39'; Ulusoy 25', 39' (pen.); Khalili 38'	Report	Labiadh 21' (o.g.); Eggertsson 38', 39' (pen.)

Ithrottahus Snæfellsbæjar, Ólafsvík
Referee: Veljko Bošković (Montenegro), Barry Weijers (Netherlands)

=== Group F ===
Pos	Team	Pld	W	D	L	GF	GA	GD	Pts	Qualification
1	(North Macedonia) KMF Železarec Skopje (H)	2	2	0	0	7	2	+5	6	Main round
2	(Israel) ASA Ben Gurion	2	1	0	1	6	4	+2	3	
3	(Estonia) SK Augur Tallinn	2	0	0	2	1	8	−7	0	

Source: UEFA
Rules for classification: Tiebreakers
(H) Hosts
27 August 2015
20:00

KMF Železarec Skopje (North Macedonia)	4–0	(Estonia) SK Augur Tallinn
Leveski 7', 8'; Daniel 28'; Gligorov 40'	Report

Sport Recreation Center Kale-Skopje, Skopje
Referee: Vladimir Kadykov (Russia), Ruben Guerreiro (Portugal)

28 August 2015
20:00

SK Augur Tallinn (Estonia)	1–4	(Israel) ASA Ben Gurion
Arst 23'	Report	Bliech 20'; Cohen 23'; Laniado 29'; Sabag 40'

Sport Recreation Center Kale-Skopje, Skopje
Referee: Torbjorn Eidhammer (Norway), Vladimir Kadykov (Russia)

29 August 2015
20:00

ASA Ben Gurion (Israel)	2–3	(North Macedonia) KMF Železarec Skopje
T. Shkolnik 9'; Vana 39'	Report	Teboul 14' (o.g.); Ismaili 18'; Micevski 36'

Sport Recreation Center Kale-Skopje, Skopje
Referee: Ruben Guerreiro (Portugal), Torbjorn Eidhammer (Norway)

=== Group G ===
Pos	Team	Pld	W	D	L	GF	GA	GD	Pts	Qualification
1	(Belgium) Halle-Gooik	2	2	0	0	14	1	+13	6	Main round
2	(Moldova) FC Progress Chișinău (H)	2	1	0	1	5	9	−4	3	
3	(Armenia) ASUE Futsal	2	0	0	2	1	10	−9	0	

Source: UEFA
Rules for classification: Tiebreakers
(H) Hosts
27 August 2015
18:00

FC Progress Chișinău (Moldova)	4–1	(Armenia) ASUE Futsal
Munteanu 17' (pen.), 34' (pen.); Caraman 36'; Ţîmbalist 38' (pen.)	Report	Uzunyan 33'

FMF Arena, Ciorescu
Referee: Ozan Soykan (Turkey), Fredric Nilholt (Sweden)

28 August 2015
18:00

ASUE Futsal (Armenia)	0–6	(Belgium) Halle-Gooik
	Report	Dujacquier 7'; Chaibai 15'; Khachatryan 26' (o.g.); Leo 29'; Rahou 38'; Manfroi 39'

FMF Arena, Ciorescu
Referee: Andri Vigfusson (Iceland), Ozan Soykan (Turkey)

29 August 2015
18:00

Halle-Gooik (Belgium)	8–1	(Moldova) FC Progress Chișinău
Leo 3'; Sababti 5', 15', 35'; Dujacquier 9', 39'; Zouggaghi 12'; Vandevelde 40'	Report	Costin 27'

FMF Arena, Ciorescu
Referee: Fredric Nilholt (Sweden), Andri Vigfusson (Iceland)

=== Group H ===
Pos	Team	Pld	W	D	L	GF	GA	GD	Pts	Qualification
1	(Bosnia and Herzegovina) Centar Sarajevo	2	2	0	0	24	3	+21	6	Main round
2	(Sweden) Futsal Club Göteborg	2	1	0	1	6	15	−9	3	
3	(Switzerland) Mobulu Futsal Uni Bern (H)	2	0	0	2	4	16	−12	0	

Source: UEFA
Rules for classification: Tiebreakers
(H) Hosts
27 August 2015
19:30

Mobulu Futsal Uni Bern (Switzerland)	2–5	(Sweden) Futsal Club Göteborg
Felipe Gomes 24'; Rueegsegger 29'	Report	Asp 8'; Backlund 8'; Wilhelm 25' (o.g.); Stefansson 36'; Solberg 40'

ZSSW Neufeld, Bern
Referee: Ainar Kuusk (Estonia), Damir Radović (Serbia)

28 August 2015
17:00

Futsal Club Göteborg (Sweden)	1–13	(Bosnia and Herzegovina) Centar Sarajevo
Eteus 34'	Report	Jelić 11'; Kerla 14'; Mulahmetović 14', 21', 35'; Aladžić 17' (pen.), 18'; Novoselac 20'; Jusić 26', 38'; Salčin 28'; Radmilović 31'; Delihasanović 36'

ZSSW Neufeld, Bern
Referee: Damir Radović (Serbia), Hennadiy Hora (Ukraine)

29 August 2015
19:00

Centar Sarajevo (Bosnia and Herzegovina)	11–2	(Switzerland) Mobulu Futsal Uni Bern
Jusić 4', 13', 28', 40'; Aladžić 6'; Kerla 7'; Radmilović 30', 36', 39'; Salčin 33'; Bunar 37'	Report	Jusić 4' (o.g.); Wilhelm 36'

ZSSW Neufeld, Bern
Referee: Hennadiy Hora (Ukraine), Ainar Kuusk (Estonia)

== Main round ==
The six group winners and the six group runners-up advanced to the elite round to join the four teams which received byes to the elite round.

All times were CEST (UTC+2).

=== Group 1 ===
Pos	Team	Pld	W	D	L	GF	GA	GD	Pts	Qualification
1	(Russia) TTG-Ugra Yugorsk	3	3	0	0	28	5	+23	9	Elite round
2	(France) Kremlin-Bicêtre United	3	2	0	1	7	8	−1	6	Elite round
3	(Georgia (country)) Georgians Tbilisi	3	1	0	2	7	17	−10	3	
4	(Cyprus) FC APOEL Nicosia (H)	3	0	0	3	7	19	−12	0	

Source: UEFA
Rules for classification: Tiebreakers
(H) Hosts
1 October 2015
17:00

FC APOEL Nicosia (Cyprus)	1–5	(Georgia (country)) Georgians Tbilisi
Christodoulou 8'	Report	Asatiani 13'; Shelegia 24'; Kobaidze 34'; Bobokhidze 38'; Kakabadze 40'

Eleftheria Indoor Hall, Nicosia
Referee: Borislav Kolev (Bulgaria), Moshe Bohbot (Israel)
1 October 2015
19:30

TTG-Ugra Yugorsk (Russia)	5–0	(France) Kremlin-Bicêtre United
Shayakhmetov 13', 31'; Katata 28'; Lyskov 32'; Eder 34'	Report

Eleftheria Indoor Hall, Nicosia
Referee: Marc Birkett (England), Ibrahim El Jilali (Netherlands)

2 October 2015
17:00

Georgians Tbilisi (Georgia (country))	2–13	(Russia) TTG-Ugra Yugorsk
Bobokhidze 15'; Todua 40'	Report	Lyskov 8', 24'; Davydov 9'; Niyazov 10', 26'; Eder Lima 21', 27', 27', 34'; Chishkala 28', 29'; Eder 33'; Signev 40'

Eleftheria Indoor Hall, Nicosia
Referee: Moshe Bohbot (Israel), Borislav Kolev (Bulgaria)
2 October 2015
19:30

FC APOEL Nicosia (Cyprus)	3–4	(France) Kremlin-Bicêtre United
Léo Feitoza 4', 21'; Carrasco 13'	Report	Vita Nzaka 5', 34'; Belhaj 23'; A. Mohammed 39'

Eleftheria Indoor Hall, Nicosia
Referee: Ibrahim El Jilali (Netherlands), Marc Birkett (England)

4 October 2015
15:30

Kremlin-Bicêtre United (France)	3–0	(Georgia (country)) Georgians Tbilisi
Rondon 25'; Vita Nzaka 39', 40'	Report

Eleftheria Indoor Hall, Nicosia
Referee: Borislav Kolev (Bulgaria), Moshe Bohbot (Israel)
4 October 2015
18:00

TTG-Ugra Yugorsk (Russia)	10–3	(Cyprus) FC APOEL Nicosia
Eder Lima 2', 10', 28'; Chishkala 16'; Léo Feitoza 21' (o.g.); Davydov 22'; Signev 33', 34'; Marcênio 33'; Robinho 34'	Report	Stylianou 10'; Rodolfo 13'; Kouloumbris 39'

Eleftheria Indoor Hall, Nicosia
Referee: Marc Birkett (England), Ibrahim El Jilali (Netherlands)

=== Group 2 ===
Pos	Team	Pld	W	D	L	GF	GA	GD	Pts	Qualification
1	(Portugal) Benfica	3	3	0	0	23	5	+18	9	Elite round
2	(Slovenia) Dobovec (H)	3	2	0	1	13	10	+3	6	Elite round
3	(Bulgaria) Grand Pro Varna	3	1	0	2	10	21	−11	3	
4	(Bosnia and Herzegovina) Centar Sarajevo	3	0	0	3	9	19	−10	0	

Source: UEFA
Rules for classification: Tiebreakers
(H) Hosts
30 September 2015
17:30

Benfica (Portugal)	8–2	(Bosnia and Herzegovina) Centar Sarajevo
Cecílio 6', 28', 28'; Ré 7'; Patias 17', 22'; Juanjo 30'; Gonçalo 32'	Report	Radmilović 20' (pen.); Kahvedžić 23'

Podčetrtek Sports Hall, Podčetrtek
Referee: Ilya Akimtsev (Russia), Franco Cachia (Malta)
30 September 2015
20:00

Dobovec (Slovenia)	7–2	(Bulgaria) Grand Pro Varna
R. Mordej 4', 40'; Kugler 16', 32'; Dimov 17' (o.g.); Marot 29'; Vojsk 31'	Report	Jvarashvili 6'; Nestorov 24'

Podčetrtek Sports Hall, Podčetrtek
Referee: Sebastian Stawicki (Poland), Ramil Namazov (Azerbaijan)

1 October 2015
17:30

Grand Pro Varna (Bulgaria)	2–9	(Portugal) Benfica
Nestorov 2'; Montes 19'	Report	Henmi 1', 23'; Patias 2', 12', 12', 24'; Brandi 15'; Ré 15'; Pinto 37'

Podčetrtek Sports Hall, Podčetrtek
Referee: Franco Cachia (Malta), Sebastian Stawicki (Poland)
1 October 2015
20:00

Dobovec (Slovenia)	5–2	(Bosnia and Herzegovina) Centar Sarajevo
Kugler 6'; Vojsk 30'; Kroflič 37'; Kordiš 37'; Marot 40'	Report	Kahvedžić 15'; Jelić 40'

Podčetrtek Sports Hall, Podčetrtek
Referee: Ramil Namazov (Azerbaijan), Ilya Akimtsev (Russia)

3 October 2015
17:30

Centar Sarajevo (Bosnia and Herzegovina)	5–6	(Bulgaria) Grand Pro Varna
Aladžić 1'; Novoselac 28'; Kerla 31'; Gušo 34'; Đuderija 36'	Report	Popchev 19'; Jvarashvili 20' (pen.); Pantev 32'; Stepić 33'; Dimov 36', 40' (pen.)

Podčetrtek Sports Hall, Podčetrtek
Referee: Ramil Namazov (Azerbaijan), Ilya Akimtsev (Russia)
3 October 2015
20:00

Benfica (Portugal)	6–1	(Slovenia) Dobovec
Coelho 7', 33'; Patias 15'; Chaguinha 16'; Cecílio 17'; Brandi 31'	Report	Kordiš 5'

Podčetrtek Sports Hall, Podčetrtek
Referee: Sebastian Stawicki (Poland), Franco Cachia (Malta)

=== Group 3 ===
Pos	Team	Pld	W	D	L	GF	GA	GD	Pts	Qualification
1	(Italy) ASD Pescara	3	3	0	0	24	4	+20	9	Elite round
2	(Ukraine) FC Lokomotiv Kharkiv	3	2	0	1	13	9	+4	6	Elite round
3	(Romania) City'US Târgu Mureș (H)	3	1	0	2	15	14	+1	3	
4	(Germany) Hamburg Panthers	3	0	0	3	2	27	−25	0	

Source: UEFA
Rules for classification: Tiebreakers
(H) Hosts
30 September 2015
16:00

FC Lokomotiv Kharkiv (Ukraine)	7–1	(Germany) Hamburg Panthers
D. Sorokin 1'; Fedorchenko 7', 26'; Ovsyannikov 15', 38'; Kiselyov 16'; Valenko 25'	Report	Matern 16'

Târgu Mureș Sports Hall, Târgu Mureș
Referee: Tarik Kečo (Bosnia and Herzegovina), Vitali Rakutski (Belarus)
30 September 2015
18:30

City'US Târgu Mureș (Romania)	3–8	(Italy) ASD Pescara
Ferreira 24', 35'; Alpar 29'	Report	Răducu 5' (o.g.); Gréllo 8', 34'; Rescia 19'; Canal 24', 26'; Leggiero 31'; Cuzzolino 33'

Târgu Mureș Sports Hall, Târgu Mureș
Referee: Gerald Bauernfeind (Austria), Balázs Farkas (Hungary)

1 October 2015
16:00

ASD Pescara (Italy)	5–1	(Ukraine) FC Lokomotiv Kharkiv
Rogerio da Silva 2', 16', 23'; Calderolli 37'; Cuzzolino 39' (pen.)	Report	Fedorchenko 29'

Târgu Mureș Sports Hall, Târgu Mureș
Referee: Vitali Rakutski (Belarus), Gerald Bauernfeind (Austria)
1 October 2015
18:30

City'US Târgu Mureș (Romania)	9–1	(Germany) Hamburg Panthers
Paulinho 20'; Ruxandari 25', 26'; Alpar 26', 36'; Tipau 28'; Ferreira 34'; Aguiar 38'; Ribeiro 39'	Report	Winkel 31'

Târgu Mureș Sports Hall, Târgu Mureș
Referee: Balázs Farkas (Hungary), Tarik Kečo (Bosnia and Herzegovina)

3 October 2015
16:00

Hamburg Panthers (Germany)	0–11	(Italy) ASD Pescara
	Report	Caputo 2'; Rescia 5', 14', 33'; Rogerio da Silva 6', 8'; Matern 16' (o.g.); Cuzzolino 23'; Borruto 29'; Nicolodi 32'; Calderolli 39'

Târgu Mureș Sports Hall, Târgu Mureș
Referee: Tarik Kečo (Bosnia and Herzegovina), Vitali Rakutski (Belarus)
3 October 2015
18:30

FC Lokomotiv Kharkiv (Ukraine)	5–3	(Romania) City'US Târgu Mureș
Fedorchenko 4'; Rogachov 11'; D. Sorokin 13', 29', 36'	Report	Stoica 1'; Paulinho 26'; Ribeiro 40'

Târgu Mureș Sports Hall, Târgu Mureș
Referee: Gerald Bauernfeind (Austria), Balázs Farkas (Hungary)

=== Group 4 ===
Pos	Team	Pld	W	D	L	GF	GA	GD	Pts	Qualification
1	(Slovakia) Slov-Matic Bratislava (H)	3	3	0	0	19	5	+14	9	Elite round
2	(North Macedonia) KMF Zelezarec Skopje	3	2	0	1	15	13	+2	6	Elite round
3	(Finland) Sievi Futsal	3	1	0	2	11	15	−4	3	
4	(Netherlands) Futsal Club Eindhoven	3	0	0	3	7	19	−12	0	

Source: UEFA
Rules for classification: Tiebreakers
(H) Hosts
30 September 2015
16:30

Futsal Club Eindhoven (Netherlands)	3–5	(Finland) Sievi Futsal
El Attabi 3', 26'; Kuylaars 38'	Report	Autio 6', 17', 33', 40' (pen.); Pakola 31'

Inter Hala Pasienky, Bratislava
Referee: Ivan Shabanov (Russia), Arsen Nonikashvili (Georgia)
30 September 2015
19:00

Slov-Matic Bratislava (Slovakia)	5–3	(North Macedonia) KMF Zelezarec Skopje
Mikita 6', 37'; Kyjovský 24'; Haľko 35'; Brunovský 40'	Report	Gligorov 8'; Micevski 10'; Leveski 23'

Inter Hala Pasienky, Bratislava
Referee: Cédric Pelissier (France), Simon Todorovič (Slovenia)

1 October 2015
15:30

KMF Zelezarec Skopje (North Macedonia)	6–3	(Netherlands) Futsal Club Eindhoven
Leovski 3'; Ismaili 15', 26'; Agushi 32'; Micevski 34'; Mar. Todorovski 36'	Report	Allouch 7'; El Attabi 27'; Kuylaars 36'

Inter Hala Pasienky, Bratislava
Referee: Simon Todorovič (Slovenia), Ivan Shabanov (Russia)
1 October 2015
18:00

Slov-Matic Bratislava (Slovakia)	6–1	(Finland) Sievi Futsal
Mikita 15'; Belaník 15'; Kyjovský 24'; Kozár 36', 38'; Rafaj 37'	Report	Pakola 6'

Inter Hala Pasienky, Bratislava
Referee: Arsen Nonikashvili (Georgia), Cédric Pelissier (France)

3 October 2015
15:30

Sievi Futsal (Finland)	5–6	(North Macedonia) KMF Zelezarec Skopje
Tirkkonen 9', 24'; Pakola 18', 28', 37'	Report	Gligorov 3', 33'; Leovski 28'; Micevski 35'; Krstevski 36'; Daniel 40'

Inter Hala Pasienky, Bratislava
Referee: Ivan Shabanov (Russia), Cédric Pelissier (France)
3 October 2015
18:00

Futsal Club Eindhoven (Netherlands)	1–8	(Slovakia) Slov-Matic Bratislava
Bali 38'	Report	Belaník 14', 30' (pen.), 35' (pen.); Mikita 22'; Višváder 22'; Haľko 26'; Kyjovský 28'; Brunovský 33'

Inter Hala Pasienky, Bratislava
Referee: Simon Todorovič (Slovenia), Arsen Nonikashvili (Georgia)

=== Group 5 ===
Pos	Team	Pld	W	D	L	GF	GA	GD	Pts	Qualification
1	(Czech Republic) FK EP Chrudim	3	2	0	1	13	6	+7	6 (Note: Ranked by head-to-head record (FK EP Chrudim: 3 pts, +1 GD; FP Halle-Gooik: 3 pts, 0 GD; FK Nikars Riga: 3 pts, −1 GD).)	Elite round
2	(Belgium) Halle-Gooik	3	2	0	1	16	9	+7	6	Elite round
3	(Latvia) FK Nikars Riga (H)	3	2	0	1	12	10	+2	6	
4	(Greece) Athina '90	3	0	0	3	2	18	−16	0	

Source: UEFA
Rules for classification: Tiebreakers
(H) Hosts
Notes:
1 October 2015
16:00

FK EP Chrudim (Czech Republic)	2–4	(Belgium) Halle-Gooik
Kovács 13', 21'	Report	Dujacquier 19', 35', 37'; Sababti 40'

Olympic Sports Centre, Riga
Attendance: 200
Referee: Swen Eichler (Germany), Oleg Ivanov (Ukraine)
1 October 2015
18:30

FK Nikars Riga (Latvia)	4–1	(Greece) Athina '90
Seņs 10'; Diakvnishvili 23' (pen.); Momčilović 40', 40'	Report	Bousbouras 36'

Olympic Sports Centre, Riga
Attendance: 450
Referee: Abdallah Benazzi (Netherlands), Kalin Kinov (Bulgaria)

2 October 2015
16:00

Athina '90 (Greece)	0–6	(Czech Republic) FK EP Chrudim
	Report	Kovács 1'; Dentinho 6', 38'; Artinos 11' (o.g.); R. Mareš 20'; Koudelka 37'

Olympic Sports Centre, Riga
Attendance: 150
Referee: Kalin Kinov (Bulgaria), Swen Eichler (Germany)
2 October 2015
18:30

FK Nikars Riga (Latvia)	6–4	(Belgium) Halle-Gooik
Seņs 11', 13', 14', 26', 32'; Diakvnishvili 39' (pen.)	Report	Leo 6'; Manfroi 20'; Chaibai 23'; Rahou 33'

Olympic Sports Centre, Riga
Attendance: 550
Referee: Oleg Ivanov (Ukraine), Abdallah Benazzi (Netherlands)

4 October 2015
13:00

Halle-Gooik (Belgium)	8–1	(Greece) Athina '90
Teixeira 2', 9'; Trussart 13', 26'; Sababti 22', 35'; Chaibai 28'; Rahou 39'	Report	Iliadis 31'

Olympic Sports Centre, Riga
Attendance: 120
Referee: Swen Eichler (Germany), Abdallah Benazzi (Netherlands)
4 October 2015
15:30

FK EP Chrudim (Czech Republic)	5–2	(Latvia) FK Nikars Riga
Kovács 1', 40'; Felipe 3', 5'; R. Mareš 17'	Report	Aleksejevs 22'; Ikstēns 32'

Olympic Sports Centre, Riga
Attendance: 500
Referee: Oleg Ivanov (Ukraine), Kalin Kinov (Bulgaria)

=== Group 6 ===
Pos	Team	Pld	W	D	L	GF	GA	GD	Pts	Qualification
1	(Belarus) LSM Lida	3	3	0	0	9	5	+4	9	Elite round
2	(Hungary) Győri ETO FC (H)	3	2	0	1	13	9	+4	6	Elite round
3	(Croatia) FC National Zagreb	3	1	0	2	9	10	−1	3	
4	(England) Baku United FC	3	0	0	3	7	14	−7	0	

Source: UEFA
Rules for classification: Tiebreakers
(H) Hosts
29 September 2015
15:30

Baku United FC (England)	4–5	(Croatia) FC National Zagreb
Rexha 8'; Pardo 14', 39'; Chus 27'	Report	Perić 8', 39'; Novak 30'; Grbeša 34'; Kocić 39'

Magvassy Mihály Sportcsarnok, Győr
Referee: Petar Mantev (Macedonia), Tomasz Frąk (Poland)
29 September 2015
17:30

Győri ETO FC (Hungary)	3–4	(Belarus) LSM Lida
Amrani 6'; Lódi 23'; Dróth 36'	Report	Ivanov 6', 10'; Chekhovski 31', 38'

Magvassy Mihály Sportcsarnok, Győr
Referee: Bogdan Sorescu (Romania), Gerard Roure Ramirez (Andorra)

30 September 2015
15:30

LSM Lida (Belarus)	4–2	(England) Baku United FC
Ros 5'; Goncharov 14'; Goroshko 15'; Chekhovski 25'	Report	Chus 29'; Rexha 40'

Magvassy Mihály Sportcsarnok, Győr
Referee: Gerard Roure Ramirez (Andorra), Petar Mantev (Macedonia)
30 September 2015
17:45

Győri ETO FC (Hungary)	5–4	(Croatia) FC National Zagreb
Dróth 3'; Juanra 5', 17'; Fumaça 9', 9'	Report	Novak 13', 14'; Matošević 26'; Surudžić 28'

Magvassy Mihály Sportcsarnok, Győr
Referee: Tomasz Frąk (Poland), Bogdan Sorescu (Romania)

2 October 2015
16:30

FC National Zagreb (Croatia)	0–1	(Belarus) LSM Lida
	Report	Goncharov 34'

Magvassy Mihály Sportcsarnok, Győr
Referee: Bogdan Sorescu (Romania), Petar Mantev (Macedonia)
2 October 2015
19:00

Baku United FC (England)	1–5	(Hungary) Győri ETO FC
Diogo da Silva 32'	Report	Juanra 3', 35'; Seidler 7', 21'; Álex 36'

Magvassy Mihály Sportcsarnok, Győr
Referee: Tomasz Frąk (Poland), Gerard Roure Ramirez (Andorra)

== Elite round ==
The draw for the elite round was held on 14 October 2015, 14:00 CEST (UTC+2), at the UEFA headquarters in Nyon, Switzerland. The 16 teams were drawn into four groups of four, containing one team which received byes to the elite round, and either two group winners and one group runner-up from the main round, or one group winner and two group runners-up from the main round. First, the four teams which were pre-selected as hosts (marked by (H) below) were drawn from their own designated pot and allocated to their respective group as per their seeding positions. Next, the remaining 12 teams were drawn from their respective pot which were allocated according to their seeding positions. Teams from the same main round group could not be drawn in the same group. For political reasons, Gazprom-Ugra Yugorsk from Russia and FC Lokomotiv Kharkiv from Ukraine (due to the Russian military intervention in Ukraine) could not be drawn in the same group.

Bye to elite round
Team
(Kazakhstan) Kairat Almaty
(Spain) Inter FS (H)
(Kazakhstan) Tulpar Karagandy
(Serbia) Ekonomac Kragujevac

Advanced from main round
Group	Winners	Runners-up
1	(Russia) Gazprom-Ugra Yugorsk	(France) Kremlin-Bicêtre United
2	(Portugal) Benfica	(Slovenia) Dobovec
3	(Italy) ASD Pescara (H)	(Ukraine) FC Lokomotiv Kharkiv
4	(Slovakia) Slov-Matic Bratislava (H)	(North Macedonia) KMF Zelezarec Skopje
5	(Czech Republic) FK EP Chrudim	(Belgium) Halle-Gooik
6	(Belarus) LSM Lida	(Hungary) Győri ETO FC (H)

The four group winners advanced to the final tournament.

All times were CET (UTC+1).

=== Group A ===
Pos	Team	Pld	W	D	L	GF	GA	GD	Pts	Qualification
1	(Spain) Inter FS (H)	3	3	0	0	22	4	+18	9	Final tournament
2	(Belarus) LSM Lida	3	2	0	1	13	8	+5	6	
3	(Slovenia) Dobovec	3	1	0	2	4	16	−12	3	
4	(France) Kremlin-Bicêtre United	3	0	0	3	5	16	−11	0	

Source: UEFA
Rules for classification: Tiebreakers
(H) Hosts
12 November 2015
18:30

LSM Lida (Belarus)	4–2	(France) Kremlin-Bicêtre United
Goroshko 10'; Ivanov 19'; Zhigalko 20', 33'	Report	Aigoun 25'; A. Mohammed 38'

Pabellón Jorge Garbajosa, Torrejón de Ardoz
Referee: Marc Birkett (England), Danijel Janošević (Croatia)
12 November 2015
21:00

Inter FS (Spain)	8–0	(Slovenia) Dobovec
Ricardinho 3', 14'; Borja 6', 31'; Cardinal 10', 12'; Kordiš 15' (o.g.); Rivillos 30'	Report

Pabellón Jorge Garbajosa, Torrejón de Ardoz
Referee: Pascal Lemal (Belgium), Balázs Farkas (Hungary)

13 November 2015
18:30

Dobovec (Slovenia)	2–7	(Belarus) LSM Lida
Vrabel 9'; Kroflič 12'	Report	Kroflič 21' (o.g..); Goncharov 23'; Goroshko 24'; Ivanov 25', 36'; Golovnyov 33'; Ros 35'

Pabellón Jorge Garbajosa, Torrejón de Ardoz
Referee: Balázs Farkas (Hungary), Pascal Lemal (Belgium)
13 November 2015
21:00

Inter FS (Spain)	10–2	(France) Kremlin-Bicêtre United
Cardinal 4', 14', 18'; Darlan 10'; Ricardinho 20'; Borja 24', 33'; Pola 24'; Humberto 34'; Panou 40'	Report	Vita 19'; Rondon 30'

Pabellón Jorge Garbajosa, Torrejón de Ardoz
Referee: Danijel Janošević (Croatia), Marc Birkett (England)

15 November 2015
17:30

Kremlin-Bicêtre United (France)	1–2	(Slovenia) Dobovec
A. Mohammed 24' (pen.)	Report	Vrabel 19'; Vojsk 36'

Pabellón Jorge Garbajosa, Torrejón de Ardoz
Referee: Pascal Lemal (Belgium), Balázs Farkas (Hungary)
15 November 2015
20:00

LSM Lida (Belarus)	2–4	(Spain) Inter FS
Goncharov 26', 37'	Report	Cardinal 28' (pen.); Ortiz 31'; Ricardinho 34'; Herrero 37'

Pabellón Jorge Garbajosa, Torrejón de Ardoz
Referee: Danijel Janošević (Croatia), Marc Birkett (England)

=== Group B ===
Pos	Team	Pld	W	D	L	GF	GA	GD	Pts	Qualification
1	(Italy) ASD Pescara (H)	3	3	0	0	10	2	+8	9	Final tournament
2	(North Macedonia) KMF Zelezarec Skopje	3	2	0	1	10	6	+4	6	
3	(Kazakhstan) Tulpar Karagandy	3	0	1	2	6	12	−6	1	
4	(Belgium) Halle-Gooik	3	0	1	2	4	10	−6	1	

Source: UEFA
Rules for classification: Tiebreakers
(H) Hosts
11 November 2015
17:30

Tulpar Karagandy (Kazakhstan)	2–2	(Belgium) Halle-Gooik
Grebonos 12'; Lazić 13'	Report	Rahou 38'; Dujacquier 40' (pen.)

Palasport Giovanni Paolo II, Pescara
Referee: Gerald Bauernfeind (Austria), Francisco Diaz (Spain)
11 November 2015
20:00

ASD Pescara (Italy)	2–0	(North Macedonia) KMF Zelezarec Skopje
Calderolli 3'; Rescia 7'	Report

Palasport Giovanni Paolo II, Pescara
Referee: Timo Onatsu (Finland), Tomasz Frak (Poland)

12 November 2015
17:30

KMF Zelezarec Skopje (North Macedonia)	6–4	(Kazakhstan) Tulpar Karagandy
Daniel 2'; Knaub 8' (o.g.); Gligorov 29', 36'; Micevski 38'; Leovski 38'	Report	Bolinha 9', 23'; Kukumbayev 27'; Roger 32'

Palasport Giovanni Paolo II, Pescara
Referee: Tomasz Frak (Poland), Gerald Bauernfeind (Austria)
12 November 2015
20:00

ASD Pescara (Italy)	4–2	(Belgium) Halle-Gooik
Borruto 20', 25'; Calderolli 20', 36'	Report	Teixeira 19'; Trussart 38'

Palasport Giovanni Paolo II, Pescara
Referee: Francisco Diaz (Spain), Timo Onatsu (Finland)

14 November 2015
17:30

Halle-Gooik (Belgium)	0–4	(North Macedonia) KMF Zelezarec Skopje
	Report	Krstevski 7', 31'; Gligorov 14'; Ismaili 28'

Palasport Giovanni Paolo II, Pescara
Referee: Timo Onatsu (Finland), Gerald Bauernfeind (Austria)
14 November 2015
20:00

Tulpar Karagandy (Kazakhstan)	0–4	(Italy) ASD Pescara
	Report	Gréllo 14'; Cuzzolino 18'; Rogerio da Silva 26', 26'

Palasport Giovanni Paolo II, Pescara
Referee: Francisco Diaz (Spain), Tomasz Frak (Poland)

=== Group C ===
Pos	Team	Pld	W	D	L	GF	GA	GD	Pts	Qualification
1	(Russia) Gazprom-Ugra Yugorsk	3	3	0	0	16	4	+12	9	Final tournament
2	(Kazakhstan) Kairat Almaty	3	2	0	1	11	10	+1	6	
3	(Hungary) Győri ETO FC (H)	3	0	1	2	9	13	−4	1	
4	(Czech Republic) FK EP Chrudim	3	0	1	2	4	13	−9	1	

Source: UEFA
Rules for classification: Tiebreakers
(H) Hosts
10 November 2015
16:30

Kairat Almaty (Kazakhstan)	2–5	(Russia) Gazprom-Ugra Yugorsk
Douglas 30'; Moraes 31'	Report	Eder Lima 7', 30'; Davydov 12'; Katata 15'; Kupatadze 31'

Magvassy Mihály Sportcsarnok, Győr
Referee: Eduardo Fernandes Coelho (Portugal), Borut Šivic (Slovenia)
10 November 2015
19:00

Győri ETO FC (Hungary)	3–3	(Czech Republic) FK EP Chrudim
Seidler 12'; Álex 18', 34'	Report	Kovács 3'; Taverna 19'; Rešetár 29'

Magvassy Mihály Sportcsarnok, Győr
Referee: Alessandro Malfer (Italy), Lukáš Peško (Slovakia)

11 November 2015
16:30

FK EP Chrudim (Czech Republic)	1–4	(Kazakhstan) Kairat Almaty
Slováček 35'	Report	Igor 9'; Divanei 9', 11'; Joan 37'

Magvassy Mihály Sportcsarnok, Győr
Referee: Borut Šivic (Slovenia), Alessandro Malfer (Italy)
11 November 2015
19:00

Győri ETO FC (Hungary)	2–5	(Russia) Gazprom-Ugra Yugorsk
Drahovský 21'; Katata 40' (o.g.)	Report	Katata 8'; Eder Lima 12'; Davydov 34'; Lyskov 39'; Robinho 39'

Magvassy Mihály Sportcsarnok, Győr
Referee: Lukáš Peško (Slovakia), Eduardo Fernandes Coelho (Portugal)

13 November 2015
15:30

Gazprom-Ugra Yugorsk (Russia)	6–0	(Czech Republic) FK EP Chrudim
Robinho 9', 32'; Signev 10'; Eder Lima 20', 29', 30'	Report

Magvassy Mihály Sportcsarnok, Győr
Referee: Borut Šivic (Slovenia), Lukáš Peško (Slovakia)
13 November 2015
18:00

Kairat Almaty (Kazakhstan)	5–4	(Hungary) Győri ETO FC
Moraes 2'; Igor 13'; Jé 33'; Divanei 37'; Higuita 38'	Report	Álex 8'; Dróth 19'; Drahovský 23'; Seidler 36'

Magvassy Mihály Sportcsarnok, Győr
Referee: Eduardo Fernandes Coelho (Portugal), Alessandro Malfer (Italy)

=== Group D ===
Pos	Team	Pld	W	D	L	GF	GA	GD	Pts	Qualification
1	(Portugal) Benfica	3	2	0	1	9	5	+4	6 (Note: Ranked by head-to-head record (Benfica: 3 pts; FC Lokomotiv Kharkiv: 0 pts).)	Final tournament
2	(Ukraine) FC Lokomotiv Kharkiv	3	2	0	1	8	3	+5	6	
3	(Slovakia) Slov-Matic Bratislava (H)	3	1	1	1	7	8	−1	4	
4	(Serbia) Ekonomac Kragujevac	3	0	1	2	3	11	−8	1	

Source: UEFA
Rules for classification: Tiebreakers
(H) Hosts
Notes:
10 November 2015
17:30

Ekonomac Kragujevac (Serbia)	0–3	(Portugal) Benfica
	Report	Wilhelm 24'; Coelho 34'; Patias 38'

Ondrej Nepela Arena, Bratislava
Referee: Bogdan Sorescu (Romania), Swen Eichler (Germany)
10 November 2015
20:00

Slov-Matic Bratislava (Slovakia)	0–2	(Ukraine) FC Lokomotiv Kharkiv
	Report	Rafaj 1' (o.g.); D. Sorokin 2'

Ondrej Nepela Arena, Bratislava
Referee: Admir Zahovič (Slovenia), Borislav Kolev (Bulgaria)

11 November 2015
17:30

FC Lokomotiv Kharkiv (Ukraine)	6–1	(Serbia) Ekonomac Kragujevac
Shoturma 4'; Ovsyannikov 21', 29'; Zhurba 24', 33', 40'	Report	Rnić 36'

Ondrej Nepela Arena, Bratislava
Referee: Swen Eichler (Germany), Admir Zahovič (Slovenia)
11 November 2015
20:05

Slov-Matic Bratislava (Slovakia)	5–4	(Portugal) Benfica
Haľko 4'; Bahna 7'; Belaník 35'; Bartošek 35', 36'	Report	Brandi 4'; Wilhelm 12'; Patias 39'; Coelho 40'

Ondrej Nepela Arena, Bratislava
Referee: Borislav Kolev (Bulgaria), Bogdan Sorescu (Romania)

13 November 2015
15:30

Benfica (Portugal)	2–0	(Ukraine) FC Lokomotiv Kharkiv
Wilhelm 34'; Cecílio 40'	Report

Ondrej Nepela Arena, Bratislava
Referee: Bogdan Sorescu (Romania), Borislav Kolev (Bulgaria)
13 November 2015
18:00

Ekonomac Kragujevac (Serbia)	2–2	(Slovakia) Slov-Matic Bratislava
Stojković 1'; Pavlović 11'	Report	Rafaj 4'; Pavlović 24' (o.g.)

Ondrej Nepela Arena, Bratislava
Referee: Swen Eichler (Germany), Admir Zahovič (Slovenia)

== Final tournament ==
The hosts of the final tournament was selected by UEFA from the four qualified teams on 11 December 2015, and was staged by Inter FS at the Palacio Multiusos de Guadalajara in Guadalajara, Spain, on 22 and 24 April 2016.

The draw for the final tournament was held on 15 March 2016, 20:30 CET (UTC+1), at half-time of the UEFA Champions League round of 16 second leg between Atlético Madrid and PSV Eindhoven, at the Vicente Calderón Stadium in Madrid, Spain. The four teams were drawn into two semi-finals without any restrictions.

In the final tournament, extra time and penalty shoot-out would be used to decide the winner if necessary; however, no extra time would be used in the third place match.

=== Bracket ===
Semi-finals
22 April
(Russia) Gazprom-Ugra Yugorsk (p)	4 (3)
(Portugal) Benfica	4 (2)
22 April
(Italy) ASD Pescara	2
(Spain) Inter FS	4

Final
24 April
(Russia) Gazprom-Ugra Yugorsk	4
(Spain) Inter FS	3
Third place match
24 April
(Portugal) Benfica (p)	2 (2)
(Italy) ASD Pescara	2 (0)

All times were CEST (UTC+2).

=== Semi-finals ===
22 April 2016
17:30

Gazprom-Ugra Yugorsk (Russia)	4–4 (a.e.t.)	(Portugal) Benfica
Lyskov 21'; Signev 30'; Afanasyev 32'; Katata 42'	Report	Chaguinha 15'; Patias 32', 41'; Jefferson 38'
Penalties
Marcênio (penalty scored); Shayakhmetov (penalty scored); Robinho (penalty scored)	3–2	(penalty scored) Patias; (penalty scored) Wilhelm; (penalty missed) Henmi

Palacio Multiusos de Guadalajara, Guadalajara
Referee: Pascal Lemal (Belgium), Cédric Pelissier (France)
22 April 2016
20:30

ASD Pescara (Italy)	2–4	(Spain) Inter FS
Canal 6'; Salas 38'	Report	Ricardinho 9'; Cardinal 12'; Rafael 21'; Mario Rivillos 40'

Palacio Multiusos de Guadalajara, Guadalajara
Referee: Saša Tomić (Croatia), Bogdan Sorescu (Romania)

=== Third place match ===
24 April 2016
18:00

Benfica (Portugal)	2–2	(Italy) ASD Pescara
Ré 34'; Coelho 39'	Report	Canal 20'; Borruto 21'
Penalties
Patias (penalty scored); Coelho (penalty scored)	2–0	(penalty missed) Nicolodi; (penalty missed) Ercolessi

Palacio Multiusos de Guadalajara, Guadalajara
Referee: Cédric Pelissier (France), Pascal Lemal (Belgium)

=== Final ===
24 April 2016
20:30

Gazprom-Ugra Yugorsk (Russia)	4–3	(Spain) Inter FS
Afanasyev 6', 38'; Marcênio 18'; Katata 40'	Report	Cardinal 6'; Pola 14'; Daniel 40'

Palacio Multiusos de Guadalajara, Guadalajara
Attendance: 3851
Referee: Bogdan Sorescu (Romania), Saša Tomić (Croatia)

== Top goalscorers ==
Rank	Player	Team	PR	MR	ER	FT	Total
1	(Russia) Eder Lima	(Russia) Gazprom-Ugra Yugorsk	—	7	6	0	13
2	(Italy) Alessandro Patias	(Portugal) Benfica	—	7	2	2	11
3	(Finland) Joni Pakola	(Finland) Sievi Futsal	5	5	—	—	10
3	(Brazil) Rogério da Silva	(Italy) ASD Pescara	3	5	2	0	10
5	(Portugal) Fernando Cardinal	(Spain) Inter FS	—	—	6	2	8
5	(Finland) Rami Tirkkonen	(Finland) Sievi Futsal	6	2	—	—	8
7	(Italy) Mauro Canal	(Italy) ASD Pescara	3	2	0	2	7
7	(Belgium) Valentin Dujacquier	(Belgium) Halle-Gooik	3	3	1	—	7
7	(North Macedonia) Aleksandar Gligorov	(North Macedonia) KMF Železarec Skopje	1	3	3	—	7
7	(Serbia) Mladen Kocić	(Croatia) FC National Zagreb	6	1	—	—	7

Final tournament top scorer:

- (Russia) Andrei Afanasyev, playing for (Russia) Gazprom-Ugra Yugorsk (3 goals)
