= RSC Anderlecht Futsal =

Futsal section of the RSC Anderlecht sports club

- Full name: Royal Sporting Club Anderlecht Futsal
- Founded: 2004; 22 years ago
- Ground: Alfasun Indoor Arena, Roosdaal, Belgium
- Capacity: 1,400
- President: Michael Verschueren
- Head coach: Luca Cragnaz
- League: Belgian Futsal Division 1
- Website: futsal.rsca.be
| Home colours | Away colours |

Royal Sporting Club Anderlecht Futsal is a professional futsal club based in Roosdaal, Belgium. It is a part of the R.S.C. Anderlecht football club.

The club was founded in 2004 under the name Futsal Project Halle-Gooik. It was then a futsal club based in Halle. In 2022, the club joined RSC Anderlecht. At that time, the team was already a regular participant in the UEFA Futsal Champions League, and it had been in the top-10 of the UEFA Futsal Club Ranking continuously for the previous years.

== History ==
=== First stage of the club ===
The club was founded in April 2004 under the name Gooik-Neigem ZVC and from the 2004–05 season, it played in the fourth Provincial (amateur) series of the RBFA futsal competition. The team's outfit consisted of light blue and white colours. The first season was successfully concluded in second place and promotion to the third Provincial Division was enforced. The following season a second place was also achieved and the club was promoted again. In the 2007–08 season a stunt was made in the Belgian Cup and the club managed to advance to the 1/8 finals. In the second Provincial Division, the club managed to achieve a second place. This result was equaled in the following season and promotion to the first Provincial Division was enforced. There a third place was conquered in the final ranking in the 2009–10 season and the transition was made to the third National Division. Within a few seasons, the club had managed to reach the national series from the lowest division.

=== National series ===
In its first season in the national series, Gooik-Neigem immediately became champions and thus secured promotion to the second National Division. Tim Vergauwen was then hired as coach and the Molenbos sports hall in Zellik became the new home base. In the following season, the club achieved second place in the final standings of the second National Division. For the 2012–13 season, Frank Luypaert was hired as coach and the core was expanded with Mustapha Harram, Marco Ferrian, Antoine Mageren and, from the new year, with internationals Rodigro Zico and Jonathan Neukermans. The club managed to remain undefeated for an entire competition year and became champions. In the Belgian Cup, the club reached the semi-finals.

=== Highest level ===
In the 2013–14 season, the club played in the first National Division and immediately managed to take third place in the final standings. In the Belgian Cup, the club reached the semi-finals. At the end of the season, internationals Omar Rahou, Valentin Dujacquier, Karim Chaibai and Reda Dahbi joined the club. The name was also changed to Futsal Project Halle-Gooik and the club moved to the top sports hall De Bres in Halle.

Halle-Gooik crest

In the following season, the club managed to win both the National title and the Belgian Cup. A new coach was also appointed, André Vanderlei. The club was again strengthened, this time with Ahmed Sababti, Omar Zougghagi, Leo Carello Aleixo and Felipe Manfroi. In the 2015–16 season, Halle-Gooik managed to win the double again. The team was allowed to participate in the UEFA Futsal Cup for the first time. There, they immediately reached the Elite round, after finishing second in a group with Latvia's Nikars Riga, Czech FK Chrudim and Greece's Athína '90 in the Main round. In the Elite round, the club faced Kazakhstan's Tulpar Karagandy, Italian Pescara Calcio a 5 and Macedonia's Zelezarec Skopje. The club also won the BeNeCup, after Dutch FCK De Hommel withdrew from the return match in Halle. At the end of the season, Massimiliano Bellarte was appointed coach and players included Marco Zaramello, Gabriel Gréllo, Fernando Leitão and Thiago Bissoni.

Halle-Gooik won its third consecutive national title in the 2016–17 season and was a losing finalist in the Belgian Cup against Gelko Hasselt. The club also won the BeNeCup against FT Antwerp, after having eliminated Dutch side ZVV 'T Knooppunt Amsterdam in the semi-finals. In the UEFA Futsal Cup, the club finished in third place in the Main round in a group with Italian side Real Rieti, Portuguese side Sporting CP and Bosnian side Centar Sarajevo. A women's team was also launched in September 2017, namely FP Halle-Gooik Girls. The first match took place in October of the same year against Lasne-Ohain. In addition, Juan Francisco Fuentes Zamora was appointed head coach of the men's team and Jacky Munaron as goalkeeper coach. The group of players was strengthened with Tiago De Bail and Gonzalez Galan. In the 2017–18 season, the men's team won the double again and qualified for the elite round of the UEFA Futsal Cup after winning the group in the Main rounds in a pool with Swiss Futsal Minerva, German Jahn Regensburg and Finnish Sievi Futsal. In the Elite round, the club finished second in its group, which consisted of Portuguese Sporting CP, Russian ISK Dina Moskva and Croatian Nacional Zagreb FC. In the 2018–19 season, Halle-Gooik managed to win the Belgian title for the fifth time in a row. Although they reached the Elite round, the results of the (renamed) UEFA Futsal Champions League were disappointing.

They did not participate in the 2020–21 UEFA Futsal Champions League. Futsal Team Charleroi won the title the year before in the 2019–20 season, which was shortened by the Corona pandemic. In 2021–22, FP Halle-Gooik was crowned Belgian champion again, again after being knocked out in the Elite round of the Futsal Champions League.

At the end of March 2022, FP Halle-Gooik merged with the football club RSC Anderlecht. From the 2022–23 season they started to play under the name RSCA Futsal, in purple and white colours. The Alfasun Indoor Arena in Roosdaal became their new home base.

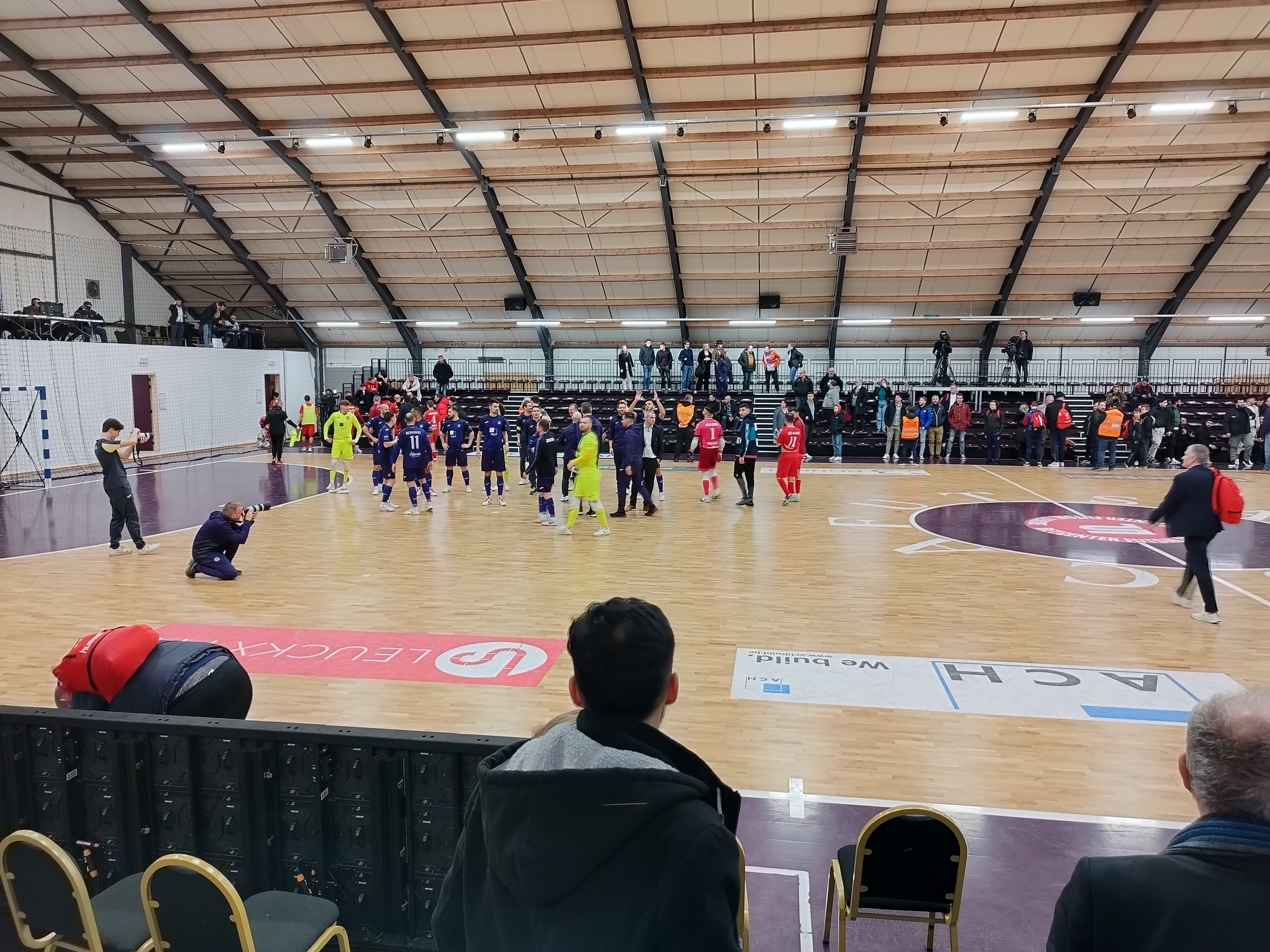
Players saluting the supporters after a 2023 game

In the 2022–23 season, the team reached the Final Four of the Futsal Champions League for the first time, after eliminating FC Barcelona, among others. In April, they won the Belgian Cup after a 10–3 victory in the final against R.E. Herentals. And in June, the club was able to win the Belgian championship. In 26 league matches, RSCA Futsal managed to score 204 goals and conceded only 54 goals. Both trophies were also won the following season.

In January 2024, RSCA Futsal was nominated for the prestigious Futsalplanet Awards, as one of the ten best men's clubs in the world.

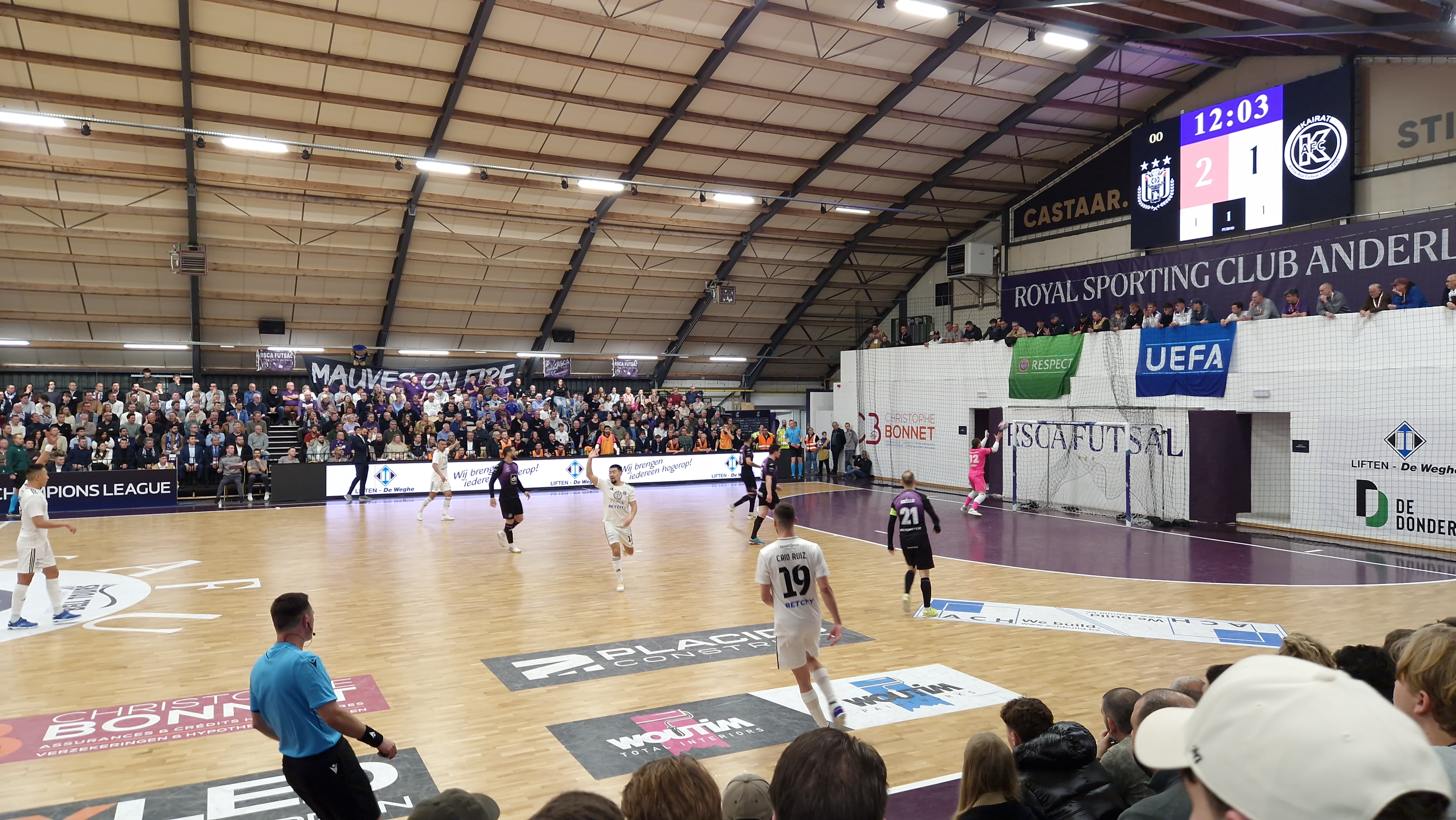
Home game against Kairat in the 2025–26 Champions League

== Honours ==
=== National competitions ===
- Belgian Futsal Division 1: 10
  - 2014–15, 2015–16, 2016–17, 2017–18, 2018–19, 2021–22, 2022–23, 2023–24, 2024–25, 2025–26
- Belgian Cup: 9
  - 2014–15, 2015–16, 2017–18, 2018–19, 2021–22, 2022–23, 2023–24, 2024–25, 2025–26
- Belgian Super Cup: 8
  - 2016, 2017, 2018, 2019, 2023, 2024, 2025, 2026

=== European competitions ===
- BeNeCup: 2
  - 2015, 2016
- Overseas Supercup: 1
  - 2018
- European Pro Futsal Cup: 1
  - 2019

== Current squad ==
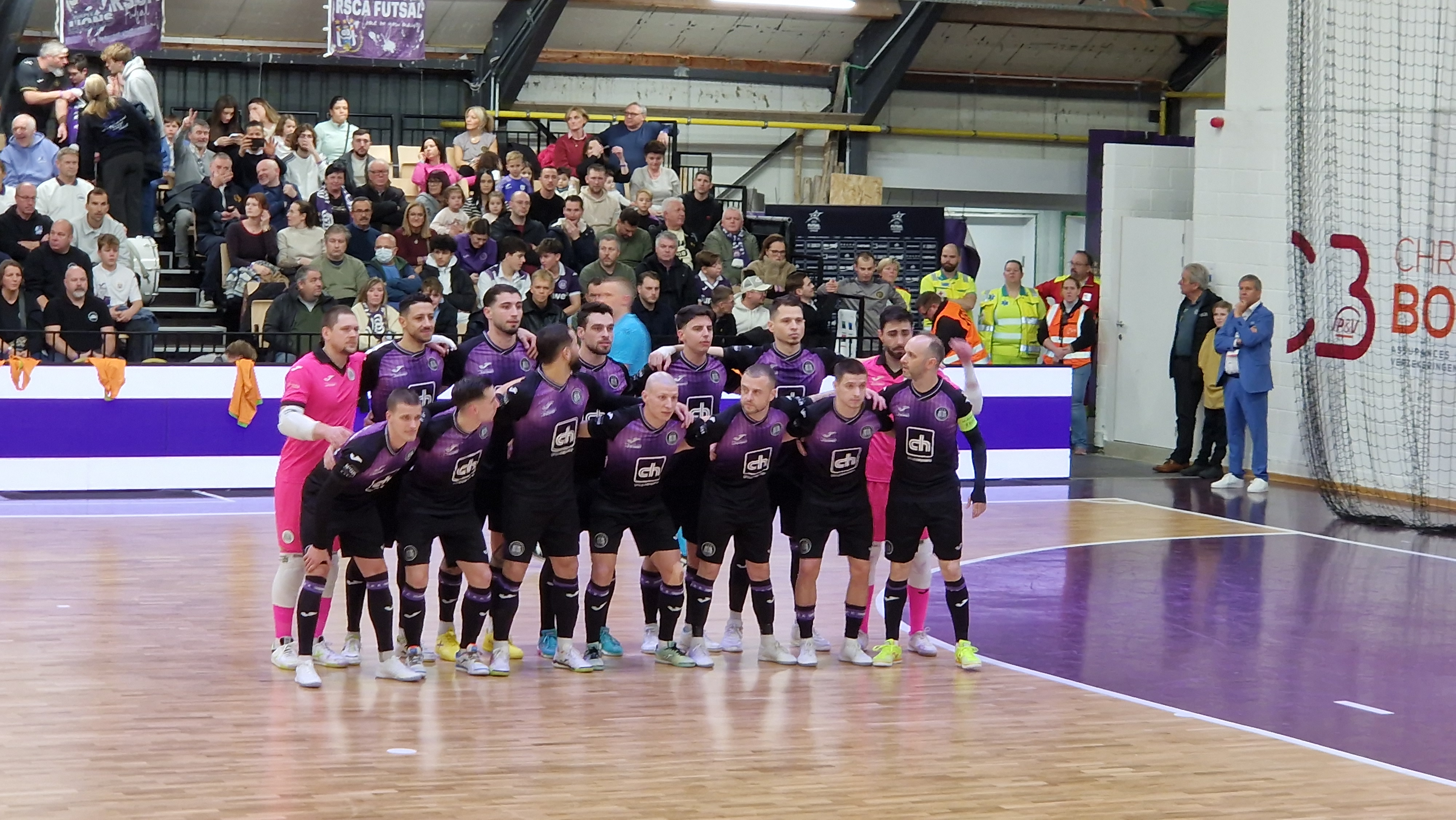
The squad during the 2025–26 Champions League

As of 21 November 2026

Note: Flags indicate national team as defined under FIFA eligibility rules; some limited exceptions apply. Players may hold more than one non-FIFA nationality.

| No. | Pos. | Nation | Player |
|---|---|---|---|
| 1 | Goalkeeper | BEL | Tom Cardoen |
| 2 | Goalkeeper | BRA | Dudu Felten |
| 5 | Defender | BRA | Rangel Taian |
| 6 | Winger | AZE | Edu |
| 7 | Winger | BEL | Steven Dillien |
| 9 | Pivot | BRA | Bruno Gomes |
| 10 | Winger | LAT | Edgars Tarakanovs |
| 11 | Winger | ESP | Raúl Jimenez |
| 12 | Winger | BRA | Fabinho |
| 15 | Winger | BEL | Kenneth Vanderheyden |
| 17 | Pivot | BEL | Ilyan Amri |
| 21 | Winger | BEL | Gréllo (captain) |
| 23 | Fixo | SRB | Stefan Rakic |
| 31 | Winger | BEL | Janis Suet |
| 71 | Goalkeeper | UKR | Ivan Bielimov |
| 77 | Winger | BRA | Lucas Pedala |
| 99 | Pivot | BRA | Jean 'Gaucho' do Carmo Paulo |

Notable former players include:

- (Italy) Alessandro Patias
- (Belgium) André Vanderlei
- (Italy) Cainan de Matos
- (Brazil) Diogo
- (Spain) Fernandão
- (Portugal) Fernando Leitão
- (Croatia) Franko Jelovčić
- (Belgium) Karim Chaibai
- (Belgium) Mustapha Harram
- (Argentina) Nicolás Sarmiento
- (Belgium) Omar Rahou
- (Brazil) Roncáglio
- (Belgium) Valentin Dujacquier

== Season to season ==
=== National divisions standings ===
| Season | Tier | Division | Place | Notes |
|---|---|---|---|---|
| 2010–11 | 3 | Division 3A | 1st | |
| 2011–12 | 2 | Division 2A | 2nd | |
| 2012–13 | 2 | Division 2A | 1st | |
| 2013–14 | 1 | Division 1 | 3rd | |
| 2014–15 | 1 | Division 1 | 3rd | |
| [2015–16 | 1 | Division 1 | 1st | |
| 2016–17 | 1 | Division 1 | 1st | |
| 2017–18 | 1 | Division 1 | 1st | |
| 2018–19 | 1 | Division 1 | 1st | |

| Season | Tier | Division | Place | Notes |
|---|---|---|---|---|
| 2019–20 | 1 | Division 1 | 2nd | |
| 2020–21 | 1 | Division 1 | 1st | |
| 2021–22 | 1 | Division 1 | 1st | |
| 2022–23 | 1 | Division 1 | 1st | |
| 2023–24 | 1 | Division 1 | 1st | |
| 2024–25 | 1 | Division 1 | 1st | |

=== European competitions record ===
Appearances: 8

| Season | Competition | Round | Venue (Host City) | Opponent | Result |
|---|---|---|---|---|---|
| 2015–16 | UEFA Futsal Cup | Preliminary round (Group G) | FMF Arena (Ciorescu) | (Armenia) ASUE Futsal | 6–0 |
| 2015–16 | UEFA Futsal Cup | Preliminary round (Group G) | FMF Arena (Ciorescu) | (Romania) Progress Chișinău | 8–1 |
| 2015–16 | UEFA Futsal Cup | Main round (Group 2) | Olympic Sports Centre (Riga) | (Czech Republic) FK EP Chrudim | 4–2 |
| 2015–16 | UEFA Futsal Cup | Main round (Group 2) | Olympic Sports Centre (Riga) | (Estonia) FK Nikars Riga | 4–6 |
| 2015–16 | UEFA Futsal Cup | Main round (Group 2) | Olympic Sports Centre (Riga) | (Greece) Athina 90 | 8–1 |
| 2015–16 | UEFA Futsal Cup | Elite round (Group B) | Palasport Giovanni Paolo II (Pescara) | (Kazakhstan) Tulpar Karagandy | 2–2 |
| 2015–16 | UEFA Futsal Cup | Elite round (Group B) | Palasport Giovanni Paolo II (Pescara) | (Italy) ASD Pescara | 2–4 |
| 2015–16 | UEFA Futsal Cup | Elite round (Group B) | Palasport Giovanni Paolo II (Pescara) | (North Macedonia) Zelezarec Skopje | 0–4 |
| 2016–17 | UEFA Futsal Cup | Main round (Group 5) | PalaPaternesi (Foligno) | (Italy) Real Rieti | 2–2 |
| 2016–17 | UEFA Futsal Cup | Main round (Group 5) | PalaPaternesi (Foligno) | (Portugal) Sporting CP | 1–5 |
| 2016–17 | UEFA Futsal Cup | Main round (Group 5) | PalaPaternesi (Foligno) | (Bosnia and Herzegovina) Centar Sarajevo | 4–3 |
| 2017–18 | UEFA Futsal Cup | Main round (Group 7) | Raahe Sports Hall (Raahe) | (Switzerland) Futsal Minerva | 8–0 |
| 2017–18 | UEFA Futsal Cup | Main round (Group 7) | Raahe Sports Hall (Raahe) | (Germany) Jahn Regensburg | 6–0 |
| 2017–18 | UEFA Futsal Cup | Main round (Group 7) | Raahe Sports Hall (Raahe) | (Finland) Sievi Futsal | 2–0 |
| 2017–18 | UEFA Futsal Cup | Elite round (Group B) | Pavilhão João Rocha (Lisbon) | (Portugal) Sporting CP | 2–3 |
| 2017–18 | UEFA Futsal Cup | Elite round (Group B) | Pavilhão João Rocha (Lisbon) | (Russia) Dina Moskva | 2–1 |
| 2017–18 | UEFA Futsal Cup | Elite round (Group B) | Pavilhão João Rocha (Lisbon) | (Croatia) Nacional Zagreb | 3–1 |
| 2018–19 | UEFA Futsal Champions League | Main round (Group 1) | Sportcomplex De Bres (Halle) | (Portugal) Sporting CP | 3–5 |
| 2018–19 | UEFA Futsal Champions League | Main round (Group 1) | Sportcomplex De Bres (Halle) | (France) Kremlin-Bicêtre | 9–4 |
| 2018–19 | UEFA Futsal Champions League | Main round (Group 1) | Sportcomplex De Bres (Halle) | (Spain) FC Barcelona | 3–7 |
| 2018–19 | UEFA Futsal Champions League | Elite round (Group A) | Alytus Arena (Alytus) | (Lithuania) Vytis | 5–2 |
| 2018–19 | UEFA Futsal Champions League | Elite round (Group A) | Alytus Arena (Alytus) | (Spain) Inter FS | 3–4 |
| 2018–19 | UEFA Futsal Champions League | Elite round (Group A) | Alytus Arena (Alytus) | (Russia) FK Dobovec | 4–5 |
| 2019–20 | UEFA Futsal Champions League | Main round (Group 2) | Sportcomplex De Bres (Halle) | (Azerbaijan) Araz Naxçivan | 5–1 |
| 2019–20 | UEFA Futsal Champions League | Main round (Group 2) | Sportcomplex De Bres (Halle) | (Ukraine) Prodexim Kherson | 3–7 |
| 2019–20 | UEFA Futsal Champions League | Main round (Group 2) | Sportcomplex De Bres (Halle) | (Portugal) Benfica | 2–6 |
| 2019–20 | UEFA Futsal Champions League | Elite round (Group A) | Universal Sports Hall CSKA (Moscow) | (Russia) FK Dobovec | 1–3 |
| 2019–20 | UEFA Futsal Champions League | Elite round (Group A) | Universal Sports Hall CSKA (Moscow) | (Russia) KPRF | 1–2 |
| 2019–20 | UEFA Futsal Champions League | Elite round (Group A) | Universal Sports Hall CSKA (Moscow) | (Bosnia and Herzegovina) Mostar | 8–3 |
| 2021–22 | UEFA Futsal Champions League | Main round (Group 1) | Športová hala Arena (Lučenec) | (Portugal) Benfica | 1–2 |
| 2021–22 | UEFA Futsal Champions League | Main round (Group 1) | Športová hala Arena (Lučenec) | (Slovakia) Lučenec | 7–1 |
| 2021–22 | UEFA Futsal Champions League | Main round (Group 1) | Športová hala Arena (Lučenec) | (Russia) Sinara Yekaterinburg | 0–1 |
| 2021–22 | UEFA Futsal Champions League | Elite round (Group C) | TJ Lokomotiva Plzeň (Plzeň) | (Slovenia) Plzeň | 3–6 |
| 2021–22 | UEFA Futsal Champions League | Elite round (Group C) | TJ Lokomotiva Plzeň (Plzeň) | (Spain) Barcelona | 4–8 |
| 2021–22 | UEFA Futsal Champions League | Elite round (Group C) | TJ Lokomotiva Plzeň (Plzeň) | (Slovenia) Dobovec | 4–1 |
| 2022–23 | UEFA Futsal Champions League | Main round (Group 1) | Belleheide Sport Center (Roosdaal) | (Kazakhstan) Kairat | 2–2 |
| 2022–23 | UEFA Futsal Champions League | Main round (Group 1) | Belleheide Sport Center (Roosdaal) | (France) Sporting Paris | 4–0 |
| 2022–23 | UEFA Futsal Champions League | Main round (Group 1) | Belleheide Sport Center (Roosdaal) | (Spain) Palma Futsal | 2–2 |
| 2022–23 | UEFA Futsal Champions League | Elite round (Group D) | Mate Parlov Sport Centre (Pula) | (Croatia) Futsal Pula | 3–2 |
| 2022–23 | UEFA Futsal Champions League | Elite round (Group D) | Mate Parlov Sport Centre (Pula) | (Spain) Barcelona | 5–5 |
| 2022–23 | UEFA Futsal Champions League | Elite round (Group D) | Mate Parlov Sport Centre (Pula) | (Romania) United Galați | 9–0 |
| 2022–23 | UEFA Futsal Champions League | Semi-final | Palma Arena (Palma de Mallorca) | (Portugal) Sporting CP | 1–7 |
| 2022–23 | UEFA Futsal Champions League | Third place | Palma Arena (Palma de Mallorca) | (Portugal) Benfica | 3–4 |
| 2023–24 | UEFA Futsal Champions League | Main round (Group 2) | Lagator Hall (Loznica) | (Serbia) KMF Loznica-Grad | 2–1 |
| 2023–24 | UEFA Futsal Champions League | Main round (Group 2) | Lagator Hall (Loznica) | (Spain) Barcelona | 1–2 |
| 2023–24 | UEFA Futsal Champions League | Main round (Group 2) | Lagator Hall (Loznica) | (Malta) Luxol St Andrews | 5–1 |
| 2023–24 | UEFA Futsal Champions League | Elite round (Group C) | Pavilhão João Rocha (Lisbon) | (Hungary) Haladás | 5–2 |
| 2023–24 | UEFA Futsal Champions League | Elite round (Group C) | Pavilhão João Rocha (Lisbon) | (Serbia) KMF Loznica-Grad | 8–1 |
| 2023–24 | UEFA Futsal Champions League | Elite round (Group C) | Pavilhão João Rocha (Lisbon) | (Portugal) Sporting CP | 1–4 |
| 2024–25 | UEFA Futsal Champions League | Main round (Group 1) | Alfasun Indoor Arena (Roosdaal) | (Ukraine) HIT Kyiv | 8–2 |
| 2024–25 | UEFA Futsal Champions League | Main round (Group 1) | Alfasun Indoor Arena (Roosdaal) | (Poland) Rekord Bielsko-Biała | 1–3 |
| 2024–25 | UEFA Futsal Champions League | Main round (Group 1) | Alfasun Indoor Arena (Roosdaal) | (Spain) Jimbee Cartagena | 4–4 |
| 2024–25 | UEFA Futsal Champions League | Elite round (Group C) | Pavilhão João Rocha (Lisbon) | (Portugal) Sporting CP | 1–4 |
| 2024–25 | UEFA Futsal Champions League | Elite round (Group C) | Pavilhão João Rocha (Lisbon) | (Portugal) SC Braga | 6–1 |
| 2024–25 | UEFA Futsal Champions League | Elite round (Group C) | Pavilhão João Rocha (Lisbon) | (Czech Republic) SK Plzeň | 3–2 |
| 2025–26 | UEFA Futsal Champions League | Main round (Group 1) | Gliwice Arena (Gliwice) | (Poland) Piast Gliwice | 1–2 |
| 2025–26 | UEFA Futsal Champions League | Main round (Group 1) | Gliwice Arena (Gliwice) | (Spain) Jimbee Cartagena | 0–4 |
| 2025–26 | UEFA Futsal Champions League | Main round (Group 1) | Gliwice Arena (Gliwice) | (Lithuania) Kauno Žalgiris | 4–0 |
| 2025–26 | UEFA Futsal Champions League | Round of 16 | Alfasun Indoor Arena (Roosdaal) | (Kazakhstan) Kairat | 3–7 |
| 2025–26 | UEFA Futsal Champions League | Round of 16 | Kairat Sport Complex (Almaty) | (Kazakhstan) Kairat | 3–5 |

=== Summary ===
UEFA competitions
| Competition | Played | Won | Drawn | Lost | Goals For | Goals Against | Goal Difference | Last season played |
|---|---|---|---|---|---|---|---|---|
| UEFA Futsal Cup | 16 | 10 | 2 | 4 | 64 | 35 | +29 | 2017–18 |
| UEFA Futsal; Champions League | 42 | 17 | 4 | 21 | 151 | 135 | +16 | 2025–26 |
| Total | 58 | 27 | 6 | 25 | 215 | 170 | +45 | |
