= 2014–15 UEFA Futsal Cup =

2014–2015 UEFA Futsal Cup
Tournament details
- Dates: 26 August 2014 – 26 April 2015
- Teams: 49 (from 48 associations)

Final positions
- Champions: Kairat Almaty (2nd title)
- Runners-up: FC Barcelona
- Third place: Sporting CP
- Fourth place: MFK Dina Moskva

Tournament statistics
- Matches played: 103
- Goals scored: 717 (6.96 per match)
- Top scorer(s): 10 goals: (Brazil) Café (SC Paris) (Equatorial Guinea) Roberto Tobe (Baku United FC) (Russia) Dmitri Prudnikov (MFK Dina Moskva )

The 2014–15 UEFA Futsal Cup was the 29th edition of Europe's premier club futsal tournament and the 14th edition under the current UEFA Futsal Cup format.

Times are CET (UTC+1) during winter and CEST (UTC+2) during summer.

== Preliminary round ==
=== Group A ===
Team	Pld	W	D	L	GF	GA	GD	Pts	(Netherlands)	(Republic of Ireland)	(Turkey)	(Wales)
(Netherlands) Hovocubo	3	3	0	0	13	3	+10	9		3–2		8–0
(Republic of Ireland) Eden College Futsal	3	2	0	1	15	7	+8	6			4–2	9–2
(Turkey) Istanbul Üniversitesi SK	3	1	0	2	11	8	+3	3	1–2			
(Wales) Wrexham Futsal Club	3	0	0	3	4	25	−21	0			2–8	

=== Group B ===
Team	Pld	W	D	L	GF	GA	GD	Pts	(England)	(Bosnia and Herzegovina)	(Gibraltar)	(Sweden)
(England) Baku United FC	3	3	0	0	26	3	+23	9		6–3	10–0	
(Bosnia and Herzegovina) MNK Centar Sarajevo	3	2	0	1	20	14	+6	6			10–7	7–1
Gibraltar Scorpions FC	3	0	1	2	11	24	−13	1				4–4
(Sweden) Malmö City FC	3	0	1	2	5	21	−16	1	0–10			

=== Group C ===
Team	Pld	W	D	L	GF	GA	GD	Pts	(Poland)	(Finland)	(Lithuania)	(Scotland)
(Poland) Rekord Bielsko-Biała	3	3	0	0	17	3	+14	9			5–2	10–0
(Finland) FS Ilves Tampere	3	2	0	1	18	2	+16	6	1–2		5–0	
(Lithuania) FK Lokomotyvas Radviliškis	3	1	0	2	12	12	0	3				10–2
(Scotland) Perth Saltires	3	0	0	3	2	32	−30	0		0–12		

=== Group D ===
Team	Pld	W	D	L	GF	GA	GD	Pts	(Cyprus)	(Estonia)	(Albania)	(Germany)
(Cyprus) FC APOEL Nicosia	3	3	0	0	24	5	+19	9		5–3	9–1	
(Estonia) FC Anzhi Tallinn	3	1	1	1	12	10	+2	4				6–2
(Albania) KF Flamurtari Vlorë	3	1	1	1	8	15	−7	4		3–3		
(Germany) NAFI Stuttgart	3	0	0	3	6	20	−14	0	1–10		3–4	

=== Group E ===
Team	Pld	W	D	L	GF	GA	GD	Pts	(Belarus)	(Armenia)	(Andorra)	(Austria)
(Belarus) MFC Stalitsa Minsk	3	3	0	0	21	5	+16	9		2–1		12–3
(Armenia) FC Talgrig Yerevan	3	2	0	1	20	7	+13	6			9–1	
(Andorra) FC Encamp	3	1	0	2	6	19	−13	3	1–7			
(Austria) FSC Schwaz	3	0	0	3	10	26	−16	0		4–10	3–4	

=== Group F ===
Team	Pld	W	D	L	GF	GA	GD	Pts	(Croatia)	(Malta)	(Denmark)
(Croatia) MNK Alumnus Zagreb	2	2	0	0	14	4	+10	6		7–2	
(Malta) Balzan	2	1	0	1	7	10	−3	3			5–3
(Denmark) København Futsal	2	0	0	2	5	12	−7	0	2–7		

=== Group G ===
Team	Pld	W	D	L	GF	GA	GD	Pts	(North Macedonia)	(Montenegro)	(Israel)
(North Macedonia) KMF Železarec Skopje	2	2	0	0	13	5	+8	6		4–1	
(Montenegro) FC Agama Podgorica	2	1	0	1	5	5	0	3			4–1
(Israel) ASA Ben Gurion	2	0	0	2	5	13	−8	0	4–9		

=== Group H ===
Team	Pld	W	D	L	GF	GA	GD	Pts	(Bulgaria)	(Moldova)	(Switzerland)
(Bulgaria) FC Grand Pro Varna	2	1	1	0	10	3	+7	4		2–2	
(Moldova) FC Progress Chișinău	2	1	1	0	6	3	+3	4			4–1
(Switzerland) Uni Futsal Bulle	2	0	0	2	2	12	−10	0	1–8		

== Main round ==
Note: FC Lokomotiv Kharkiv (Ukraine) were originally drawn into Group 3 with hosts MFK Dina Moskva (Russia). Due to the Russo-Ukrainian war, a draw was held to reallocate Lokomotiv, and they switched groups with Futsal Team Charleroi (Belgium).

=== Group 1 ===
Team	Pld	W	D	L	GF	GA	GD	Pts	(France)	(Czech Republic)	(Belarus)	(North Macedonia)
(France) Sporting Club de Paris	3	3	0	0	22	14	+8	9		6–4		6–3
(Czech Republic) FK EP Chrudim	3	2	0	1	11	10	+1	6			3–2	4–2
(Belarus) MFC Stalitsa Minsk	3	1	0	2	15	16	−1	3	7–10			
(North Macedonia) KMF Železarec Skopje	3	0	0	3	8	16	−8	0			3–6	

=== Group 2 ===
Team	Pld	W	D	L	GF	GA	GD	Pts	(Latvia)	(Bulgaria)	(Poland)	(Georgia (country))
(Latvia) FK Nikars Riga	3	2	0	1	7	3	+4	6		4–1	3–1	
(Bulgaria) FC Grand Pro Varna	3	2	0	1	7	4	+3	6				4–0
(Poland) Rekord Bielsko-Biała	3	1	0	2	5	5	0	3		0–2		
(Georgia (country)) Iberia Star Tbilisi	3	1	0	2	1	8	−7	3	1–0		0–4	

=== Group 3 ===
Team	Pld	W	D	L	GF	GA	GD	Pts	(Russia)	(Belgium)	(Romania)	(Croatia)
(Russia) MFK Dina Moskva	3	3	0	0	17	6	+11	9			4–2	8–3
(Belgium) Futsal Team Charleroi	3	2	0	1	8	9	−1	6	1–5			4–2
(Romania) FC Deva	3	1	0	2	8	9	−1	3		2–3		
(Croatia) MNK Alumnus Zagreb	3	0	0	3	7	16	−9	0			2–4	

=== Group 4 ===
Team	Pld	W	D	L	GF	GA	GD	Pts	(Spain)	(Ukraine)	(Slovenia)	(Netherlands)
(Spain) Inter FS	3	3	0	0	16	4	+12	9			6–2	5–0
(Ukraine) FC Lokomotiv Kharkiv	3	2	0	1	13	6	+7	6	2–5			
(Slovenia) KMN Kobarid	3	1	0	2	7	13	−6	3		1–6		4–1
(Netherlands) Hovocubo	3	0	0	3	1	14	−13	0		0–5		

=== Group 5 ===
Team	Pld	W	D	L	GF	GA	GD	Pts	(England)	(Serbia)	(Italy)	(Greece)
(England) Baku United FC	3	3	0	0	12	3	+9	9				2–0
(Serbia) KMF Ekonomac Kragujevac	3	2	0	1	7	7	0	6	1–4			3–1
(Italy) Luparense C/5	3	1	0	2	7	9	−2	3	2–6	2–3		
(Greece) Athina '90	3	0	0	3	1	8	−7	0			0–3	

=== Group 6 ===
Team	Pld	W	D	L	GF	GA	GD	Pts	(Hungary)	(Slovakia)	(Cyprus)	(Norway)
(Hungary) MVFC Berettyóújfalu	3	2	0	1	10	6	+4	6			2–3	3–2
(Slovakia) Slov-Matic Bratislava	3	2	0	1	9	6	+3	6	1–5		5–1	
(Cyprus) FC APOEL Nicosia	3	1	1	1	7	10	−3	4				3–3
(Norway) Vegakameratene	3	0	1	2	5	9	−4	1		0–3		

== Elite round ==
FC Barcelona, Kairat Almaty, Araz Naxçivan and Sporting CP received a bye to the Elite Round due to their coefficient ranking. The games were disputed between 18 and 23 of November 2014.

=== Group A ===
Team	Pld	W	D	L	GF	GA	GD	Pts	(Portugal)	(Spain)	(Belgium)	(Bulgaria)
(Portugal) Sporting CP	3	3	0	0	14	5	+9	9			5–3	8–2
(Spain) Inter FS	3	2	0	1	10	1	+9	6	0–1			6–0
(Belgium) Futsal Team Charleroi	3	1	0	2	6	9	−3	3		0–4		
(Bulgaria) FC Grand Pro Varna	3	0	0	3	2	17	−15	0			0–3	

=== Group B ===
Team	Pld	W	D	L	GF	GA	GD	Pts	(Russia)	(Czech Republic)	(Slovakia)	(Azerbaijan)
(Russia) MFK Dina Moskva	3	3	0	0	12	5	+7	9				5–4
(Czech Republic) FK EP Chrudim	3	2	0	1	8	4	+4	6	0–3		2–1	
(Slovakia) Slov-Matic Bratislava	3	1	0	2	6	9	−3	3	1–4			
(Azerbaijan) Araz Naxçivan	3	0	0	3	7	15	−8	0		0–6	3–4	

=== Group C ===
Team	Pld	W	D	L	GF	GA	GD	Pts	(Kazakhstan)	(France)	(Serbia)	(Latvia)
(Kazakhstan) Kairat Almaty	3	3	0	0	28	12	+16	9		11–7		11–2
(France) Sporting Club de Paris	3	2	0	1	16	16	0	6				5–4
(Serbia) KMF Ekonomac Kragujevac	3	0	1	2	9	15	−6	1	3–6	1–4		
(Latvia) FK Nikars Riga	3	0	1	2	11	21	−10	1			5–5	

=== Group D ===
Team	Pld	W	D	L	GF	GA	GD	Pts	(Spain)	(Ukraine)	(England)	(Hungary)
(Spain) FC Barcelona	3	3	0	0	14	2	+12	9			5–1	4–1
(Ukraine) FC Lokomotiv Kharkiv	3	2	0	1	6	7	−1	6	0–5		2–1	
(England) Baku United FC	3	1	0	2	8	7	+1	3				6–0
(Hungary) MVFC Berettyóújfalu	3	0	0	3	2	14	−12	0		1–4		

== Final four ==
The finals will be hosted by Sporting CP, following a decision of the UEFA Executive Committee on 26 January 2015. The draw for the finals was made at half-time of the Primeira Liga match between Sporting CP and S.L. Benfica on 8 February 2015 at the Estádio José Alvalade, around 21:45 CET (UTC+1). The matches will be played at MEO Arena, Lisbon on 24–26 April 2015.

Semi-finals
24 April
(Russia) MFK Dina Moskva	4
(Kazakhstan) Kairat Almaty (a.e.t.)	7
24 April
(Spain) FC Barcelona	5
(Portugal) Sporting CP	3

Final
26 April
(Kazakhstan) Kairat Almaty	3
(Spain) FC Barcelona	2
Third place
26 April
(Russia) MFK Dina Moskva	3
(Portugal) Sporting CP	8

=== Semi-finals ===
24 April 2015
19:00

MFK Dina Moskva (Russia)	4–7 (a.e.t.)	(Kazakhstan) Kairat Almaty
Esquerdinha (23:28); Prudnikov (39:45)	Report	Leo (10:42); Divanei (41:03); Douglas (45:11); Lukaian (46:49)

MEO Arena, Lisbon
Attendance: 3500
Referee: Saša Tomić (CRO)

24 April 2015
21:30

FC Barcelona (Spain)	5–3	(Portugal) Sporting CP
Dyego (15:49); Wilde (25:11); Bateria (39:24); Paco Sedano (39:59)	Report	Diogo (11:46); João Matos (32:25); Caio Japa (36:21)

MEO Arena, Lisbon
Attendance: 12,076
Referee: Alessandro Malfer (ITA)

=== Third place play-off ===
26 April 2015
16:00

MFK Dina Moskva (Russia)	3–8	(Portugal) Sporting CP
Esquerdinha (11:51); Kuzenok (36:09)	Report	Alex (16:45); João Matos (23:13); Marcelinho (26:43); Diogo (29:59); Cristiano (35:29)

MEO Arena, Lisbon
Attendance: 8521
Referee: Bogdan Sorescu (ROU)

=== Final ===
26 April 2015
18:30

Kairat Almaty (Kazakhstan)	3–2	(Spain) FC Barcelona
Humberto (16:39); Divanei (18:50); Igor (31:06)	Report	Saad (29:40); Lin (31:30)

MEO Arena, Lisbon
Attendance: 5110
Referee: Gábor Kovács (HUN)

UEFA Futsal Cup
2014–15 winners

2nd title

== Top goalscorers ==
Rank	Player	Club	PR	MR	ER	FI	Total
1	(Brazil) Café	Sporting Club de Paris	–	3	7	-	10
1	(Equatorial Guinea) Roberto Tobe	Baku United FC	5	4	1	-	10
1	(Russia) Dmitri Prudnikov	MFK Dina Moskva	–	4	4	2	10
4	(Azerbaijan) Augusto	Sporting Club de Paris	–	5	4	–	9
5	(Finland) Juhana Jyrkiäinen	FS Ilves Tampere	8	-	-	-	8
5	(Ukraine) Denis Gumenyuk	MFC Stalitsa Minsk	7	1	-	-	8
5	(Spain) Mario Rivillos	Inter FS	–	5	3	-	8
5	(Spain) Carlos Munoz Delgado	Baku United FC	4	1	3	-	8
5	(Kazakhstan) Leo Jaraguá	Kairat Almaty	–	-	4	4	8
10	(Brazil) Carlinhos	MFK Dina Moskva	–	5	2	0	7
10	(Brazil) Alex Martins	Sporting CP	–	-	3	4	7
10	(Russia) Leandro Esquerdinha	MFK Dina Moskva	–	-	3	4	7
13	(Georgia (country)) Roninho	Sporting Club de Paris	–	6	-	-	6
13	(Armenia) Saro Galstyan	FC Talgrig Yerevan	6	-	-	-	6
13	(Spain) Popo	Gibraltar Scorpions FC	6	-	-	-	6
13	(Croatia) Kristijan Grbeša	MNK Alumnus Zagreb	4	2	-	-	6
13	(Cyprus) Constantinos Kouloumbris	FC APOEL Nicosia	5	1	-	-	6
13	(Hungary) János Rábl	MVFC Berettyóújfalu	6	-	-	-	6
13	(Latvia) Maksims Seņs	FK Nikars Riga	3	3	-	-	6
13	(Spain) Marcelo	Baku United FC	3	3	-	-	6
