= Lokomotyv Kharkiv =

Lokomotiv Kharkov may refer to:

- FC Lokomotyv Kharkiv, football club
- MFC Lokomotyv Kharkiv, futsal club
