= Alessandro Patias =

Italian futsal player

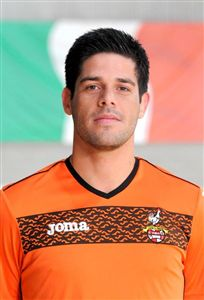
- Patias in 2013

Personal information
- Date of birth: 8 July 1985 (age 41)
- Place of birth: Mondaí, Brazil
- Height: 1.83 m (6 ft 0 in)
- Position: Pivot

Team information
- Current team: Jaraguá
- Number: 18

Senior career*
Years	Team	Apps	(Gls)
2006	John Deere		
2006–2007	Maran Terni		
2007–2008	Benicarló		
2008–2010	Montesilvano		
2010–2011	Marca		
2011–2014	Asti		
2014–2017	Benfica		
2017–2018	Napoli		
2018–2021	Halle-Gooik		
2021	Feldi Eboli		
2021–2023	Real San Giuseppe		
2023–2024	Feldi Eboli		
2024–	Jaraguá		

International career
2010–2017	Italy		
- * Club domestic league appearances and goals

Alessandro Patias (born 8 July 1985) is a Brazilian born Italian professional futsal player who plays as a pivot. His former teams include Asti, Benfica, Belgian side Halle-Gooik and the Italy national team.

== Honours ==
Montesilvano

- Serie A1: 2009–10

Marca

- Supercoppa Italiana: 2010
- Serie A1: 2010–11

Asti

- Coppa Italia: 2011–12
- Winter Cup: 2013–14

Benfica

- Liga Portuguesa: 2014–15
- Taça de Portugal: 2014–15, 2016–17
- Supertaça de Portugal: 2015, 2016

Halle-Gooik

- Belgian Futsal Division 1: 2018–19
- Belgian Cup: 2018–19
- Belgian Super Cup: 2018, 2019

Real San Giuseppe

- Coppa Italia: 2022–23

Individual

- Serie A1 top scorer: 2021–22 (35 goals)
- Coppa Italia top scorer: 2010–11, 2011–12, 2022–23
- MVP Coppa Italia: 2022–23
