= Lokomotiv Kharkiv =

Lokomotyv Kharkiv or Lokomotiv Kharkiv may refer to:

- FC Lokomotyv Kharkiv, football club
- MFC Lokomotyv Kharkiv, futsal club
- VC Lokomotyv Kharkiv, volleyball club
