= Diogo (footballer, born 1985) =

Brazilian footballer

Personal information
- Full name: Diogo Guimarães de Lana Castro
- Date of birth: 15 August 1985 (age 41)
- Place of birth: Belo Horizonte, Brazil
- Height: 1.80 m (5 ft 11 in)
- Position: Winger

Senior career*
Years	Team	Apps	(Gls)
- Minas
2007–2008	Brussels United		
2008–2009	Baio Morlanwelz		
2009	Charleroi (football)		
2009–2010	Action 21 Charleroi		
2010–2011	Selaklean Thulin		
2011–2012	Amigo Schepdaal		
2011–2012	Sporting Paris		
2012–2013	Châtelineau		
2013–2014	Sporting Paris		
2014–2018	Sporting CP	111	(92)
2018–2023	Halle-Gooik/Anderlecht		(100)
- * Club domestic league appearances and goals as of 00:00, 7 August 2018 (UTC)

Diogo Guimarães de Lana Castro (born 15 August 1985), also known as Diogo Guimarães or just Diogo, is a Brazilian former futsal player who was mainly active in Europe. Despite being a futsal player, Diogo was signed by the football club Charleroi in advance of the 2009–2010 season, but was released by the club before the end of August 2009.

In June 2023, Diogo ended his career while at Anderlecht Futsal. In his five seasons with the team, he won the title three times and the Belgian Cup twice. With Anderlecht, Diogo also scored 100 goals in the league.

== Honours ==
Action 21 Charleroi

- Belgian Futsal Division 1: 2009–10
- Belgian Cup: 2009–10

Sporting Paris

- French Division 1: 2011–12, 2013–14
- Coupe de France: 2011–12

Chatelineau

- Belgian Futsal Division 1: 2012–13
- Belgian Cup: 2012–13

Sporting CP

- Portuguese League: 2015–16, 2016–17, 2017–18
- Portuguese Cup: 2015–16, 2017–18
- Portuguese League Cup: 2014–15, 2015–16
- Portuguese Supercup: 2014, 2017
- UEFA Champions League runners-up: 2016–17, 2017–18

Halle-Gooik

- Belgian Futsal Division 1: 2018–19, 2021–22
- Belgian Cup: 2018–19, 2021–22
- Belgian Super Cup: 2018, 2019
- Overseas Supercup: 2018
- European Pro Futsal Cup: 2019

Anderlecht

- Belgian Futsal Division 1: 2022–23
- Belgian Cup: 2022–23
