= Ahmed Sababti =

Belgian footballer and futsal player

Personal information
- Date of birth: 10 December 1985 (age 40)
- Place of birth: Merksem, Belgium
- Position: Winger

Team information
- Current team: Antwerpen

Senior career*
Years	Team	Apps	(Gls)
2003–2007	Borgerhout		
2007–2015	FT Antwerpen		
2009	→ Futsal Hasselt (loan)		
2015–2017	Halle-Gooik		
2017–	FT Antwerpen		
2021	→ Real San Giuseppe (loan)		

International career
- Belgium
- * Club domestic league appearances and goals

Ahmed Sababti (born 10 December 1985) is a Belgian footballer and futsal player who plays for Futsal Topsport Antwerpen and the Belgian national futsal team.

== Honours ==
FT Antwerpen

- Belgian Futsal Division 1: 2011–12
- Belgian Cup: 2010–11
- Belgian Super Cup: 2008, 2012

Halle-Gooik

- Belgian Futsal Division 1: 2014–15, 2015–16
- Belgian Cup: 2015–16
