= Juho Alasuutari =

Finnish footballer (born 1990)

Personal information
- Date of birth: 11 June 1990 (age 36)
- Place of birth: Ylivieska, Finland
- Height: 1.80 m (5 ft 11 in)
- Position: Midfielder

Team information
- Current team: GBK
- Number: 16

Youth career
- –2008: YPA

Senior career*
Years	Team	Apps	(Gls)
2009	VPS	4	(0)
2009	→ YPA (loan)		
2010–2015	YPA	81+	(1+)
2016–	GBK	67	(1)
- * Club domestic league appearances and goals as of 28 September 2019

Juho Alasuutari (born 11 June 1990) is a Finnish footballer who plays as a midfielder for Finnish club GBK Kokkola.
