= Mustapha Harram =

Belgian futsal player

Harram
Personal information
- Full name: Mustapha Harram
- Date of birth: 29 April 1981 (age 45)
- Place of birth: Belgium
- Position: Winger

Senior career*
Years	Team	Apps	(Gls)
2000–2001	Sint-Truiden		
2001–2002	Geleeg Leopoldsburg		
2002–2007	Forcom Antwerpen		
2007–2011	Futsal Topsport Antwerpen		
2011–2012	Futsal Hasselt		
2012–2015	Halle-Gooik		
2012–2018	Futsal Hasselt		
2018–2019	Real Noorderwijk		
2019–2021	FMC Châtelet		

International career
2001–2014	Belgium	41	(6)
- * Club domestic league appearances and goals

Mustapha Harram (born 29 April 1981), is a Belgian futsal player who mainly played for Futsal Topsport Antwerp, Futsal Hasselt and Halle-Gooik and the Belgian national futsal team.
