= Mauro Canal =

Brazilian-born Italian futsal player (born 1986)

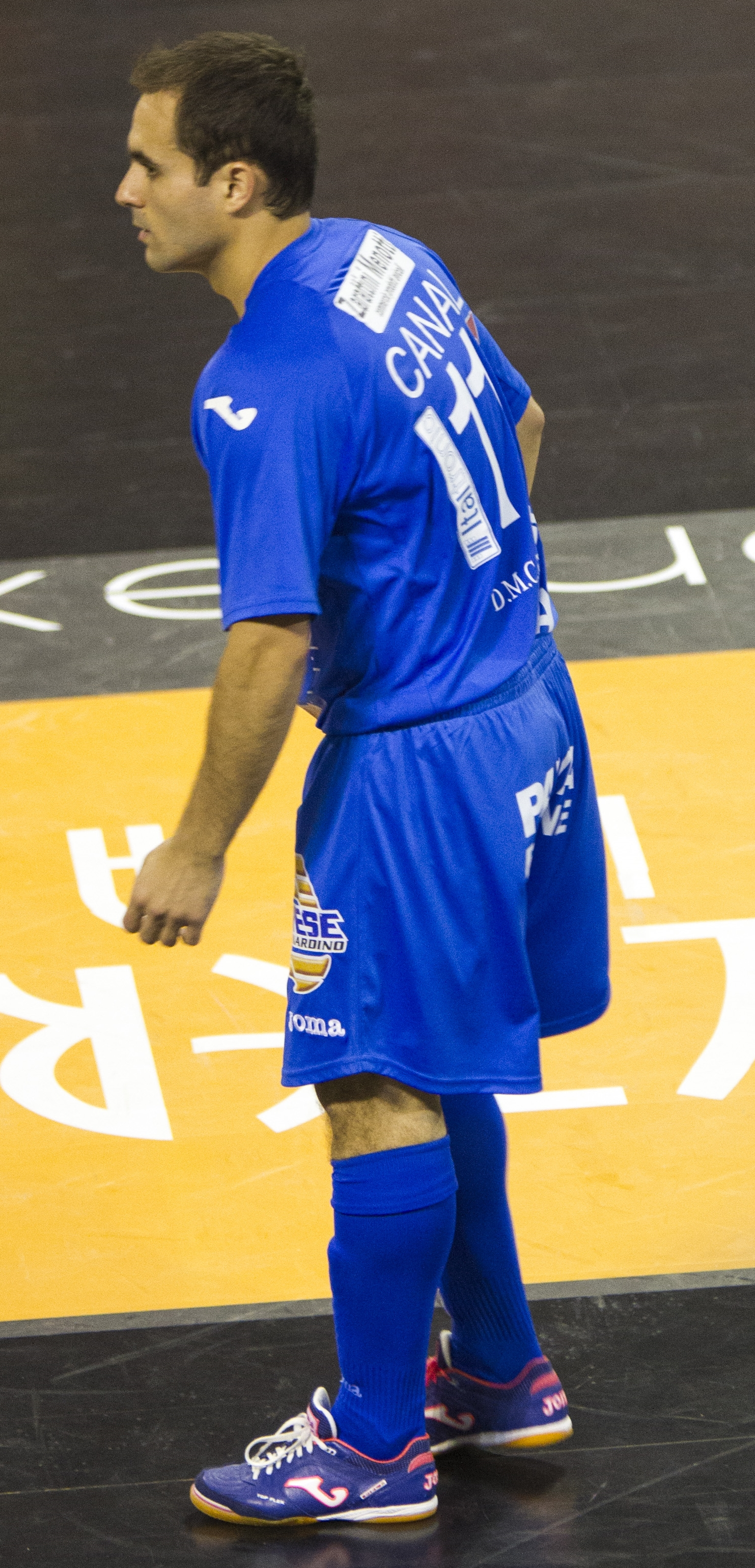

Personal information
- Date of birth: 25 June 1986 (age 40)
- Place of birth: Bebedouro, Brazil
- Height: 1.68 m (5 ft 6 in)
- Position: Winger

Team information
- Current team: Pescara

Senior career*
Years	Team	Apps	(Gls)
2003–07	Cornedo		
2007–09	Luparense		
2009–10	→ Fassina		
2010–14	Luparense		
2014–	Pescara		

International career
2010–	Italy		
- * Club domestic league appearances and goals

Mauro Canal (born 25 June 1986) is a Brazilian-born, Italian futsal player who plays for Pescara and the Italian national futsal team.
