= Vitaliy Kiselyov =

Ukrainian futsal player

Kiselyov
Personal information
- Full name: Vitaliy Kiselyov
- Date of birth: 20 February 1983 (age 43)
- Place of birth: Kharkov
- Position: Defender

Team information
- Current team: Lokomotiv Kharkiv

Senior career*
Years	Team	Apps	(Gls)
- Metalist Kharkiv
- Gazovik-CGD
- Steel Dnipropetrovsk
- Univer-Echo Kharkov
- Lokomotiv Kharkiv

International career
- Ukraine
- * Club domestic league appearances and goals

Vitaliy Kiselyov (born 20 February 1983), is a Ukrainian futsal player who plays for Lokomotiv Kharkiv and the Ukraine national futsal team.
