= Karim Chaibai =

Belgian futsal player

Personal information
- Full name: Karim Chaibai
- Date of birth: 5 October 1982 (age 44)
- Place of birth: Belgium
- Position: Winger

Team information
- Current team: FT Charleroi

Senior career*
Years	Team	Apps	(Gls)
2003–2005	Action 21		
2005–2006	Kickers Charleroi		
2006–2007	Chatelet		
2007–2009	Action 21		
2009–2014	Châtelineau		
2014–2016	FP Halle-Gooik		
2017–2022	FT Charleroi		
2022–2023	Châtelet		
2023–2024	FT Charleroi		

International career
2004–2019	Belgium	145	(68)
- * Club domestic league appearances and goals

Karim Chaibai (born 5 October 1982), is a Belgian futsal player who plays for FT Charleroi and the Belgian national futsal team.

In 2007–08, Karim Chaibai was elected best player (Golden Boot) in the Belgian Futsal Division 1 as a player for Action 21.

During the 2016–17 season, at the age of 34, Karim Chaibai scored 34 goals and won the title of top scorer in the Belgian Futsal Division 1 with Futsal Team Charleroi.
