= Valentin Dujacquier =

Belgian futsal player

Personal information
- Date of birth: 23 July 1989 (age 37)
- Place of birth: Belgium
- Position: Winger

Senior career*
| Years | Team | Apps | (Gls) |
| 2006–2011 | Action 21 Charleroi | | |
| 2015–2020 | Halle-Gooik | | |
| 2020–2021 | Real San Giuseppe | | |
| 2020–2023 | Châtelet | | |
| 2024– | Gosselies B | | |

International career
- Belgium
- * Club domestic league appearances and goals

Valentin Dujacquier (born 23 July 1989) is a Belgian futsal player who played for Action 21 Charleroi, Halle-Gooik, Futsal My-Cars Châtelet and the Belgian national futsal team. In 2021, he became the all-time top scorer of Halle-Gooik.
