= Omar Rahou =

Belgian futsal player

Personal information
- Date of birth: 19 July 1992 (age 34)
- Place of birth: Belgium
- Position: Pivot

Team information
- Current team: FT Charleroi

Senior career*
Years	Team	Apps	(Gls)
2012–2013	Châtelineau Futsal		
2015–2018	Halle-Gooik		
2019–2020	FT Charleroi		
2020–2021	Real San Giuseppe		
2021–2023	Châtelet		
2023–20	FT Charleroi		

International career
- Belgium
- * Club domestic league appearances and goals

Omar Rahou (born 19 July 1992) is a Belgian futsal player who plays for Futsal Team Charleroi and the Belgian national futsal team.
