= Leandro Cuzzolino =

Argentine futsal player (born 1987)

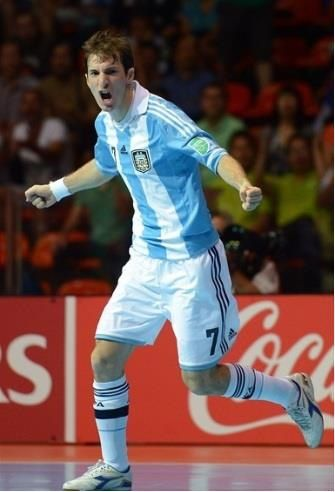

Personal information
- Full name: Leandro Cuzzolino
- Date of birth: 21 May 1987 (age 39)
- Place of birth: Buenos Aires, Argentina
- Height: 1.76 m (5 ft 9 1/2 in)
- Position: Universal

Team information
- Current team: Acqua & Sapone
- Number: 8

Youth career
- 2004–2006: Caballito Juniors

Senior career*
Years	Team	Apps	(Gls)
2006–2009	Arzignano Grifo		
2009–2013	Montesilvano		
2013–2015	Acqua & Sapone		
2015–2019	Pescara		
2019–2020	Levante UD FS		
2020–	Pesaro Calcio a 5		

International career
–	Argentina		
- * Club domestic league appearances and goals

Leandro Cuzzolino (born 21 May 1987) is an Argentine futsal player who plays for Pesaro Calcio a 5 and the Argentine national futsal team.
