= Darko Bojanović =

German tennis player

- Country (sports): Bosnia and Herzegovina
- Born: 8 February 1997 (age 28); Forchheim, Germany
- Height: 1.80 m (5 ft 11 in)
- Plays: Right-handed (two-handed backhand)
- Prize money: $18,843

Singles
- Career record: 0–1 (at ATP Tour level, Grand Slam level, and in Davis Cup)
- Career titles: 0 ITF
- Highest ranking: No. 926 (17 December 2018)

Doubles
- Career record: 0–0 (at ATP Tour level, Grand Slam level, and in Davis Cup)
- Career titles: 1 ITF
- Highest ranking: No. 831 (17 December 2018)
- Last updated on: 17 April 2023.

Darko Bojanović (born 8 February 1997) is a German-born former tennis player who represented Bosnia and Herzegovina.

Bojanović has a career high ATP singles ranking of 926 achieved on 17 December 2018. He also has a career high ATP doubles ranking of 831 achieved on 17 December 2018.

Bojanović represents Bosnia and Herzegovina at the Davis Cup, where he has a W/L record of 0–1.

== Future and Challenger finals ==
=== Doubles 3 (1–2) ===
Legend (doubles) ATP Challenger Tour (0–0) ITF Futures Tour (1–2)	Titles by surface Hard (0–0) Clay (1–2) Grass (0–0) Carpet (0–0)

Result	W–L	Date	Tournament	Tier	Surface	Partner	Opponents	Score
Win	1–0	Apr 2017	Tunisia F16, Hammamet	Futures	Clay	(Sweden) Dragoș Nicolae Mădăraș	(France) Benjamin Bonzi (France) Antoine Hoang	2–6, 6–4, [11–9]
Loss	1–1	Jan 2018	Tunisia F3, Hammamet	Futures	Clay	(Italy) Giuseppe Tresca	(Italy) Cristian Carli (Italy) Nicolò Turchetti	7–5, 2–6, [7–10]
Loss	1–2	May 2019	M15 Tabarka, Tunisia	World Tennis Tour	Clay	(Netherlands) Glenn Smits	(France) Lilian Marmousez (France) Clément Tabur	6–3, 3–6, [8–10]

== Davis Cup ==
=== Participations: (0–1) ===
Group membership World Group (0–0) WG Play-off (0–1) Group I (0–0) Group II (0–0) Group III (0–0) Group IV (0–0)	Matches by surface Hard (0–1) Clay (0–0) Grass (0–0) Carpet (0–0)	Matches by type Singles (0–1) Doubles (0–0)

- ▲ ▼ indicates the outcome of the Davis Cup match followed by the score, date, place of event, the zonal classification and its phase, and the court surface.

Rubber outcome	No.	Rubber	Match type (partner if any)	Opponent nation	Opponent player(s)	Score
▼0–4; 14–16 September 2018; Utsubo Tennis Center, Osaka, Japan; World Group Play-off; Hard surface
Defeat	1	IV	Singles (dead rubber)	Japan	Yosuke Watanuki	1–6, 3–6
