= Luca Leggiero =

Italian futsal player

Leggiero
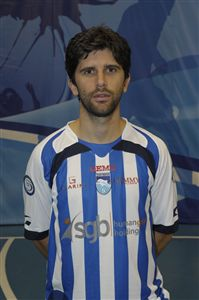

Personal information
- Full name: Luca Leggiero
- Date of birth: 11 November 1984 (age 41)
- Place of birth: Monopoli, Italy
- Height: 1.90 m (6 ft 3 in)
- Positions: Defender; wing

Team information
- Current team: Pescara Calcio a 5

Senior career*
Years	Team	Apps	(Gls)
2008–10	V. Monopoli		
2011–12	Sport Five		
2012–	Pescara		

International career
–	Italy		
- * Club domestic league appearances and goals

Luca Leggiero (born 11 November 1984), is an Italian futsal player who plays for Pescara Calcio a 5 and the Italian national futsal team.
