= Dmitri Lyskov =

Russian futsal player

Lyskov
Personal information
- Full name: Dmitri Lyskov
- Date of birth: 24 September 1987 (age 39)
- Place of birth: Glazov, Soviet Union
- Height: 1.81 m (5 ft 11 in)
- Position: Winger

Team information
- Current team: Gazprom-Ugra Yugorsk

Senior career*
Years	Team	Apps	(Gls)
2004–2006	Progress		
2006–2008	Lipetsk		
2008–2011	Mytischi		
2011–	Gazprom-Ugra		

International career
2008–	Russia		
- * Club domestic league appearances and goals

Dmitri Anatolyevich Lyskov (Russian: Дмитрий Анатольевич Лысков; born 24 September 1987), is a Russian futsal player who plays for Gazprom-Ugra Yugorsk and the Russian national futsal team.
