= Tomasz Łuba =

Polish footballer

Personal information
- Date of birth: 18 November 1986 (age 39)
- Place of birth: Grajewo, Poland
- Height: 1.84 m (6 ft 0 in)
- Position: Defender

Youth career
- ŁKS Łomża

Senior career*
Years	Team	Apps	(Gls)
–2008	ŁKS Łomża	39+	(1+)
2008	→ Wisła Płock (loan)	6	(0)
2009	Reynir Sandgerði	19	(1)
2010–2017	Víkingur Ólafsvík	147	(4)
2019	Selfoss	2	(0)
- * Club domestic league appearances and goals

Tomasz Łuba (born 18 November 1986) is a Polish former professional footballer who played as a defender.

== Career ==
Łuba started his career with Polish third tier side ŁKS Łomża, helping them earn promotion to the Polish second tier. Before the second half of 2007–08, Łuba was sent on loan to Wisła Płock in the Polish second tier, where he made 6 league appearances and scored 0 goals. On 3 May 2008, he debuted for Wisła Płock during a 0–2 loss to Stal Stalowa Wola. Before the 2010 season, Łuba signed for Icelandic third tier club Víkingur Ólafsvík, helping them earn promotion to the Icelandic top flight within 3 seasons and reach the semifinal of the 2010 Icelandic Cup.
