= Kremlin-Bicêtre United =

- Full name: Kremlin-Bicêtre United
- Founded: 2002
- Ground: Gymnase Ducass, Kremlin-Bicêtre, France
- Capacity: 1700
- League: Championnat de France de Futsal
- 2019/20: Championnat de France, 3-rd
Home colours	Away colours

Kremlin-Bicêtre United is a futsal club based in Kremlin-Bicêtre, France. The club was founded in 2002 and plays in the Championnat de France de Futsal.

== Honours ==
- 2004: Champion of Ile-de-France series 2
- 2004: Winner's Cup in Val-de-Marne
- 2006: Participated in the final phase of the National Cup (semi-finalist: 4th)
- 2007: Vice-champion of the Ile-de-France Series 1
- 2007: Semi-finalist in Paris cut
- 2007: Semi-finalist Cup Val de Marne
- 2008: Participated in the final phase of the National Cup (Finalist: 2nd)
- 2008: Semi-finalist of the first National Challenge (3rd)
- 2008: Champion of Ile-de-France Series 1
- 2008: Winner of the Coupe de Paris
- 2010: Championnat de France

== Externan link ==
- Official Website
