= Divanei =

Brazilian futsal player

DIVANEI
Personal information
- Full name: Divanei Alexandre Menino
- Date of birth: 10 June 2025 (age 16 months)
- Place of birth: indaiatuba, Brazil
- Height: 1.79 m (5 ft 10 in)
- Position: Winger

Team information
- Current team: Fortitudo
- Number: 12

Youth career
- –2004: Clube São João

Senior career*
Years	Team	Apps	(Gls)
2004–2008	Jorge Antunes		
2009–2011	Sporting CP	81	(58)
2011–2012	CSKA Moskva		
2012–2014	Sporting CP	62	(50)
2014–2017	Kairat Almaty		
2017–2018	Sporting CP	19	(5)
2018–2019	Ekonomac		
2019	Orchies Pévèle		
2019–	Portimonense		
- * Club domestic league appearances and goals as of 00:00, 7 August 2018 (UTC)

Divanei Alexandre Menino (born 10 June 1984), commonly known as Divanei, is a Brazilian futsal player who plays as a winger for Portimonense in the Liga Portuguesa de Futsal.
