= Pescara Calcio a 5 =

Italian futsal club

Pescara C5
- Full name: Pescara Calcio a 5
- Founded: 1999
- Ground: PalaRigopiano "F.Scorrano", Pescara
- Capacity: 1,500
- Chairman: Danilo Iannascoli
- League: Serie A
- 2014-15: Serie A1 (Futsal), Champion
Home colours

Pescara Calcio a 5 was a futsal club based in Pescara, Abruzzo, Italy. The club was founded in 1999 as "D'Angelantonio C5". In 2003 the denomination changes in "Pescara Sport Five" and in 2007 it took their last denomination; its indoor arena was PalaRigopiano based in Pescara with 1,500 seaters. The club was dissolved in April 2018 due to various problems.

== Honours ==
- 1 Serie A: 2014/15
- 2 Coppa Italia: 2016, 2017
- 2 Supercoppa Italiana: 2015, 2016

== Famous Players ==
=== European Champions ===
The following players have won the title of European champions to the UEFA Futsal Championship while they were playing in Pescara.

- (Italy) Sergio Romano (Belgium 2014)
- (Italy) Luca Leggiero (Belgium 2014)
- (Italy) Daniel Giasson (Belgium 2014)

=== World Champions ===
The following players have won the title of World champions to the FIFA Futsal World Cup while they were playing in Pescara.

- (Argentina) Leandro Cuzzolino (Colombia 2016)
- (Argentina) Cristian Borruto (Colombia 2016)
- (Argentina) Maximiliano Rescia (Colombia 2016)

== UEFA Club Competitions Record ==
=== UEFA Futsal Cup ===
Season	Competition	Round	Opponent	Result
2015/16	UEFA Futsal Cup	Main Round	(Romania) City'US Târgu Mureș	Win 8–3
2015/16	UEFA Futsal Cup	Main Round	(Germany) Hamburg Panthers	Win 11–0
2015/16	UEFA Futsal Cup	Main Round	(Ukraine) FC Lokomotiv Kharkiv	Win 5–1
2015/16	UEFA Futsal Cup	Elite Round	(Belgium) FP Halle-Gooik	Win 4–2
2015/16	UEFA Futsal Cup	Elite Round	(Kazakhstan) Tulpar Karagandy	Win 4–0
2015/16	UEFA Futsal Cup	Elite Round	(North Macedonia) KMF Zelezarec Skopje	Win 2–0
2015/16	UEFA Futsal Cup	Final Four	(Spain) Inter FS	Loss 2–4
2015/16	UEFA Futsal Cup	Final Four	(Portugal) SL Benfica	Loss (p) 2-2 (0-2)
2017/18	UEFA Futsal Cup	Main Round	(Kazakhstan) Kairat Almaty	Loss 1–5
2017/18	UEFA Futsal Cup	Main Round	(Belarus) Stalitsa Minsk	Loss 4–6
2017/18	UEFA Futsal Cup	Main Round	(Russia) Dinamo Moskva	Win 5–3
2017/18	UEFA Futsal Cup	Elite Round	(Serbia) Ekonomac	Loss 2–3
2017/18	UEFA Futsal Cup	Elite Round	(Netherlands) ZVV 't Knooppunt	Win 9–1
2017/18	UEFA Futsal Cup	Elite Round	(Spain) Barcelona	Loss 1–3

== European competitions record ==
UEFA competitions
Competition	Appearances	Played	Won	Drawn	Lost	Goals For	Goals Against	Last season played
UEFA Futsal Cup	2	14	8	1	5	58	42	2017–18
Total	2	14	8	1	5	58	42	
