= Flamurtari Vlorë Futsal =

KF Flamurtari Vlorë
- Full name: Klubi Futsal Flamurtari Vlorë
- Nickname(s): Kuqezinjte (Red and blacks)
- Ground: Vlorë, Albania
- President: Sinan Idrizi
- League: Albanian Futsal Championship
- 2014–15: Albanian Futsal Championship, 1st
Home colours	Away colours

KF Flamurtari Vlorë is a futsal club based in Vlorë, Albania. They have won the Albanian Futsal Championship three times since it was founded in 2003, and they are the current reigning champions. They are the futsal branch of the multi disciplinary Flamurtari Vlorë.

== Honours ==
Albanian Futsal Championship (3): 2010–11, 2013–14, 2014–15
