= FC YPA =

Finnish football club

- Full name: Jalkapalloseura FC YPA
- Founded: 1998
- Ground: Safari, Ylivieska, Finland
- Capacity: 600
- Chairman: Kai Perttu
- Manager: Dragan Pejić
- League: Kakkonen (North Group)
- 2013: Kakkonen (Northern Group), 2nd
Home colours	Away colours

FC YPA is a Finnish football club from the town of Ylivieska. FC YPA was formed in 1998. The club is currently playing in the Kakkonen, the third tier of the Finnish league system. FC YPA play their home matches at Safari.

== Futsal ==
They also have a futsal team, Sievi Futsal.

== Season to season ==
Season	Level	Division	Section	Administration	Position	Movements
2001	Tier 3	Kakkonen (Second Division)	North Group	Finnish FA (Suomen Pallolitto)	11th	Relegated
2002	Tier 4	Kolmonen (Third Division)	Section 7	Central Ostrobothnia (SPL Keski-Pohjanmaa)	3rd	Play-offs – Promoted
2003	Tier 3	Kakkonen (Second Division)	North Group	Finnish FA (Suomen Pallolitto)	9th	
2004	Tier 3	Kakkonen (Second Division)	North Group	Finnish FA (Suomen Pallolitto)	9th	
2005	Tier 3	Kakkonen (Second Division)	North Group	Finnish FA (Suomen Pallolitto)	7th	
2006	Tier 3	Kakkonen (Second Division)	Group C	Finnish FA (Suomen Pallolitto)	7th	
2007	Tier 3	Kakkonen (Second Division)	Group C	Finnish FA (Suomen Pallolitto)	5th	
2008	Tier 3	Kakkonen (Second Division)	Group C	Finnish FA (Suomen Pallolitto)	7th	
2009	Tier 3	Kakkonen (Second Division)	Group C	Finnish FA (Suomen Pallolitto)	3rd	
2010	Tier 3	Kakkonen (Second Division)	Group C	Finnish FA (Suomen Pallolitto)	3rd	
2011	Tier 3	Kakkonen (Second Division)	Group C	Finnish FA (Suomen Pallolitto)	4th	
2012	Tier 3	Kakkonen (Second Division)	North Group	Finnish FA (Suomen Pallolitto)	6th	
2013	Tier 3	Kakkonen (Second Division)	North Group	Finnish FA (Suomen Pallolitto)	2nd	

- 12 seasons in Kakkonen
- 1 season in Kolmonen

== References and sources ==
- Official Website
