= MFC Lokomotyv Kharkiv =

Lokomotyv Kharkiv
- Full name: MFC Lokomotyv Kharkiv
- Founded: 2005
- Dissolved: 2017
- Ground: Palace of Sports, Kharkiv, Ukraine
- Capacity: 1,500
- Chairman: (Ukraine) Sergey Krylov
- Manager: (Ukraine) Evgeny Rivkin
- League: Futsal Championship
Home colours	Away colours

MFC Lokomotyv Kharkiv (ukr. Міні-Футбольний Клуб «Локомотив» Харків), was a futsal club from Kharkiv, Ukraine, and played in Ukrainian Men's Futsal Championship.

On July 12, 2017, it was announced that due to financial difficulties, the club was withdrawing from further participation in the Ukrainian championship.

== Honours ==
=== Domestic ===
- Ukrainian Extra-Liga:

(gold) Winners (3): 2012/13, 2013/14, 2014/15
(silver) Runners-up (2): 2011/12, 2015/16
(bronze) Third place (2): 2010/11, 2016/17

- Ukrainian Futsal Cup:

(gold) Winners (3): 2008/09, 2015/16, 2016/17
(silver) Runners-up (2): 2011/12, 2013/14

- Ukrainian Futsal Super Cup:

(gold) Winners (4): 2013, 2014, 2015, 2016

== MFC Lokomotyv Kharkiv in European football ==
As of match played November 2015

Season	Round	Opponent	Score	Result
2013–14	Main round Kharkiv, Ukraine	(Kazakhstan) Tulpar Karagandy	2–2	D
2013–14	Main round Kharkiv, Ukraine	(France) Sporting Club de Paris	4–6	L
2013–14	Main round Kharkiv, Ukraine	(Italy) Marca Futsal	4–1	W
2013–14	Elite round Chrudim, Czech Republic	(Spain) Barcelona	1–6	L
2013–14	Elite round Chrudim, Czech Republic	(Czech Republic) FK EP Chrudim	3–2	W
2013–14	Elite round Chrudim, Czech Republic	(Romania) City'US Târgu Mureș	3–0	W
2014–15	Main round Kobarid, Slovenia	(Spain) Inter FS	2–5	L
2014–15	Main round Kobarid, Slovenia	(Slovenia) KMN Kobarid	6–1	W
2014–15	Main round Kobarid, Slovenia	(Netherlands) Hovocubo	5–0	W
2014–15	Elite round Budapest, Hungary	(Spain) Barcelona	0–5	L
2014–15	Elite round Budapest, Hungary	(Hungary) MVFC Berettyóújfalu	4–1	W
2014–15	Elite round Budapest, Hungary	(England) Baku United FC	2–1	W
2015–16	Main round Târgu Mureș, Romania	(Germany) Hamburg Panthers	7–1	W
2015–16	Main round Târgu Mureș, Romania	(Italy) Pescara	1–5	L
2015–16	Main round Târgu Mureș, Romania	(Romania) City'US Târgu Mureș	5–3	W
2015–16	Elite round Bratislava, Slovakia	(Slovakia) Slov-Matic Bratislava	2–0	W
2015–16	Elite round Bratislava, Slovakia	(Serbia) Ekonomac Kragujevac	6–1	W
2015–16	Elite round Bratislava, Slovakia	(Portugal) Benfica	0–2	L

Note: In the 2014–15 UEFA Futsal Cup, Lokomotyv Kharkiv were originally drawn into a group with hosts MFK Dina Moskva (Russia). Due to the Russo-Ukrainian War, they were reallocated to a different group. A similar political separation was applied in the 2015–16 UEFA Futsal Cup elite round draw, keeping Lokomotyv and Gazprom-Ugra Yugorsk apart.

=== Summary ===
Season	Pld	W	D	L	GF	GA	Last round
2013–14	6	3	1	2	17	17	Elite round
2014–15	6	4	0	2	19	13	Elite round
2015–16	6	4	0	2	21	12	Elite round
Total	18	11	1	6	57	42	

== See also ==
- FC Lokomotyv Kharkiv, an association football club
