= Belgian Futsal Division 1 =

- Founded: 1968
- Country: Belgium
- Confederation: UEFA
- Number of clubs: 14
- Level on pyramid: 1
- Domestic cup: Belgian Futsal Cup
- International cup: UEFA Futsal Champions League
- Current: Current Season at futsalbelgium.com

Division 1 is the premier professional futsal league in Belgium. It was founded in 1968. The league which is played under UEFA rules, currently consists of 14 teams. Organized by Royal Belgian Football Association.

== Champions ==
=== Organized by ABFS ===
Season	Winner
1968/1969	?
1969/1970	?
1970/1971	Verzekering Cools Brugge
1971/1972	Minitrappers Maasmechelen
1972/1973	Minitrappers Maasmechelen
1973/1974	MV Cevanov Blankenberge
1974/1975	MV Blankenberge
1975/1976	Sneltrappers Rekem
1976/1977	Hoboken Breughelhof ZVC
1977/1978	MVC Rekem*
1978/1979	Vleeshal Paul Leen Genk
1979/1980	Hoboken Breughelhof ZVC
1980/1981	Hoboken Breughelhof ZVC
1981/1982	Rebels Boorsem
1982/1983	ZVK Hasselt
1983/1984	Hoboken ZVC
1984/1985	ZVK Hasselt
1985/1986	ZVK Hasselt
1986/1987	ZVK Ford Genk 84
1987/1988	ZVK Hasselt
1988/1989	ZVK Hasselt
1989/1990	ZVK Ford Genk
1990/1991	ZVC Isola Hoeselt
1991/1992	titel niet toegekend
1992/1993	JC Hornu
1993/1994	JC Hornu
1994/1995	JC Hornu
1995/1996	JC Hornu
1996/1997	FCS Sambreville
1997/1998	FCS Sambreville
1998/1999	RES Hode Sambreville
1999/2000	Alliance Ecaussinnes
2000/2001	Penarol Volvo
2001/2002	Penarol Volvo
2002/2003	Penarol Volvo
2003/2004	Penarol Volvo
2004/2005	GS Hoboken
2005/2006	GS Hoboken
2006/2007	Amigo Schepdaal
2007/2008	Amigo Schepdaal
2008/2009	Amigo Schepdaal
2009/2010	Amigo Schepdaal
2010/2011	Rolini Koersel
2011/2012	Relemko Koersel

=== Organized by RBFA ===
Season	Winner
1991/1992	ZVK Hasselt
1992/1993	ZVK Hasselt
1993/1994	ZVK Hasselt
1994/1995	ZVK Sint-Truiden
1995/1996	ZVK Ford Genk
1996/1997	ZVK Ford Genk
1997/1998	ZVK Ford Genk
1998/1999	ZVK Sint-Truiden
1999/2000	Action 21 Charleroi
2000/2001	Action 21 Charleroi
2001/2002	Action 21 Charleroi
2002/2003	Action 21 Charleroi
2003/2004	Action 21 Charleroi
2004/2005	Action 21 Charleroi
2005/2006	Action 21 Charleroi
2006/2007	Forcom Antwerpen Elite
2007/2008	Action 21 Charleroi
2008/2009	Action 21 Charleroi
2009/2010	Action 21 Charleroi
2010/2011	Chatelineau
2011/2012	Futsal Topsport Antwerpen
2012/2013	Futsal Châtelineau
2013/2014	Futsal Châtelineau
2014/2015	FP Halle-Gooik
2015/2016	FP Halle-Gooik
2016/2017	FP Halle-Gooik
2017/2018	FP Halle-Gooik
2018/2019	FP Halle-Gooik
2019/2020	Futsal Team Charleroi
2020/2021	Cancelled due to COVID-19
2021/2022	FP Halle-Gooik
2022/2023	RSC Anderlecht Futsal
2023/2024	RSC Anderlecht Futsal
2024/2025	RSC Anderlecht Futsal
2025/2026	RSC Anderlecht Futsal
