= Belgian Futsal Cup =

Futsal tournament

The Belgian Cup is a cup competition in Belgian futsal. Alongside the regular competitions, it is organized by the Royal Belgian Football Association.

== Winners ==
=== Per season ===
Cup winners per season
Season	Winner
2024–2025	RSC Anderlecht Futsal (8)
2023–2024	RSC Anderlecht Futsal (7)
2022–2023	RSC Anderlecht Futsal (6)
2021–2022	FP Halle-Gooik (5)
2020–2021	No edition due to the COVID-19 pandemic
2019–2020	No edition due to the COVID-19 pandemic
2018–2019	FP Halle-Gooik (4)
2017–2018	FP Halle-Gooik (3)
2016–2017	FS Gelko Hasselt
2015–2016	FP Halle-Gooik (2)
2014–2015	FP Halle-Gooik
2013–2014	Futsal Châtelineau (3)
2012–2013	Futsal Châtelineau (2)
2011–2012	A&M Châtelineau
2010–2011	Chase Antwerpen
2009–2010	Action 21 Charleroi (5)
2008–2009	Futsal Morlanwelz
2007–2008	KK Malle
2006–2007	Action 21 Charleroi (4)
2005–2006	Action 21 Charleroi (3)
2004–2005	Action 21 Charleroi (2)
2003–2004	Action 21 Charleroi
2002–2003	TLR Antwerpen
2001–2002	Kickers Charleroi
2000–2001	ZVC Berchem
1999–2000	TL Ranst
1998–1999	Ougrée Neupré Unis (2)
1997–1998	ZVK Eisden
1996–1997	Ougrée Neupré Unis
1995–1996	ZVK Ford Genk (4)
1994–1995	ZVK Ford Genk (3)
1993–1994	ZVK Ter Linde Mortsel
1992–1993	ZVK Sint-Truiden
1991–1992	ZVC Dynamo Sint-Niklaas
