= André Vanderlei =

Belgian futsal player

Personal information
- Full name: André Luiz de Oliveira Vanderlei
- Date of birth: 27 June 1978 (age 48)
- Place of birth: Recife, Brasil
- Position: Winger

Team information
- Current team: Real Herentals

Senior career*
Years	Team	Apps	(Gls)
2002–2005	Action 21 Charleroi		
2005–2006	GDL Châtelet		
2006–2009	Action 21 Charleroi		
2007	→ S10 Saragozza (loan)		
2007–2008	→ Junkie's Frameries (loan)		
2009–2013	Futsal Châtelineau		
2013–2014	Charleroi 21		
2014–2015	Halle-Gooik		

International career
2007–2013	Belgium	49	(26)

Managerial career
- 2013–2014: Charleroi 21
- 2014–2016: Halle-Gooik
- 2016–2023: Étoile Lavalloise
- 2023–: Real Herentals
- * Club domestic league appearances and goals

André Vanderlei (born 27 June 1978), known simply as André, is a Brazilian-born Belgian futsal manager and former player for the Belgian national futsal team.

== Club level ==
Born in Recife, Brazil, he moved in 2002 to Charleroi, Belgium, after being spotted by the Brazilian Action 21 coach Ricardo Mendez. Accompanied by his wife, his little girl and other Brazilian recruits, Vanderlei was part of a golden generation that failed twice in the European Cup final in 2002 and 2003, against Castellón. He recalled at the end of 2019: “My best memory remains the first final lost. It was that which motivated us to work even harder”.

In 2002–2003, his team lost a second time in the final against Castellón, despite Vanderlei's two goals (4–6). On an individual level, the Brazilian finished top scorer in the competition with fifteen goals, just like the following season (19 goals in 2003–2004). This last performance remains the record for a single edition and Vanderlei is the only player to have been top scorer in two different seasons.

After beating Dinamo Moskva in the final, the Belgian team eventually won the European cup in 2004–2005.

In 2007–2008, André played for the Frameries club on loan. He left Action 21 for neighboring Châtelineau. In October 2011, he became the Belgian top scorer.

In November 2013, Andre Vanderlei left Futsal Châtelineau, where he was the top scorer, and returned to Charleroi 21.

Vanderlei retired from playing in 2013 due to a tragic event: "Since I arrived in Belgium, there was a child who followed me a lot. Unfortunately, he died of cancer. After he left, I lost the pleasure of playing and I decided to stop to become a coach".

== National team ==
Naturalized Belgian in 2007, Vanderlei became a Belgian international and participated in two European Championships. He remembers at the end of 2019: "My last international match was in Brazil".

At the end of 2016, he remembers "Belgium gave me at all levels, so I happily accepted to represent it. Our best performance was a qualification for the 2010 European Championship in Hungary. But my greatest memory is having played three times against Brazil, it touched me a lot".

He has a total of 49 caps and 26 goals with the Belgian selection.

== Managerial career ==
André Vanderlei started to coach the youth team at Charleroi and then became player-coach of the first team during the 2013–2014 season.

In the first half of the 2014–15 season, André Vanderlei joined FSP Halle-Gooik. The Belgian-Brazilian proved himself by combining the roles of player and coach within the club, which extended his contract by two years in March 2015. At the end of the season, his team was crowned Belgian champion after its victory against Antwerp in the playoff final. The team also won the Belgian Cup and the Belgian-Dutch BeNeCup. The next season, Halle-Gooik grabbed the three trophies again, but despite the successes, the team decided to change their manager.

For the 2016-2017 season, Vanderlei became coach of Étoile Lavalloise MFC in French Division 2 at the age of 38. In 2022–23, following the arrival of several reinforcements, Étoile Lavalloise achieved the Cup-Championship double and Vanderlei was elected coach of the season.

Vanderlei moved to Belgian first Division team Real Elmos Herentals in 2023.

== Honours ==
=== Player ===
Action 21 Charleroi

- Belgian Futsal Division 1: 2002–03, 2003–04, 2004–05
- Belgian Cup: 2003–04, 2004–05
- Belgian Super Cup: 2003, 2004, 2005
- UEFA Futsal Cup: 2004–05 (winners), 2001–02, 2002–03 (runners-up)
- BeNeLux cup: 2003
- Intercontinental Futsal Cup: 2004 (third place)
- International Tournament of Porto: 2005

Châtelineau

- Belgian Futsal Division 1: 2012–13

=== Manager ===
Halle-Gooik

- Belgian Futsal Division 1: 2014–15, 2015–16
- Belgian Cup: 2014–15, 2015–16

Étoile Lavalloise

- Championnat de France: 2022–23
- Coupe de France: 2022–23

=== Individual ===
- UEFA Futsal Cup top scorer: 2002–03 (15 goals), 2003–04 (19 goals)
- UEFA Futsal Champions League all time top scorer (54 goals): 2019
- French Championship Trainer of the Season: 2022–23
