= 2013–14 UEFA Futsal Cup =

Tournament details
- Dates: 2013–2014
- Teams: 48 (Total); 16 (Elite Round); 4 (Final Four)

Final positions
- Champions: FC Barcelona (2nd title)
- Runners-up: Dinamo Moskva

The 2013–14 UEFA Futsal Cup was the 28th edition of Europe's premier club futsal tournament and the 13th edition under the current UEFA Futsal Cup format.

== Preliminary round ==
The draw for the preliminary round and the main roud took place on 3 July 2013 in the UEFA headquarters in Nyon, Switzerland. First, the 29 lowest ranked teams were divided into 5 groups of 4 and 3 of 3 and later the tournament hosts were selected, which are indicated in italics. The preliminary round ran from 27 to 31 August, with only the group winners advancing to the next round.

=== Group A ===
Team	Pts	Pld	W	D	L	GF	GA	GD
(France) Sporting Club de Paris	6	2	2	0	0	25	0	+25
(Moldova) Lexmax Chişinău	3	2	1	0	1	4	8	-4
(Lithuania) FK Nautara Kaunas	0	2	0	0	2	0	21	-21

27 August 2013

FK Nautara Kaunas (Lithuania)	0–4	(Moldova) Lexmax Chişinău

S.Darius & S.Girenas Sport Center, Kaunas

28 August 2013

Lexmax Chişinău (Moldova)	0–8	(France) Sporting Club de Paris

S.Darius & S.Girenas Sport Cente, Kaunas

29 August 2013

Sporting Club de Paris (France)	17–0	(Lithuania) FK Nautara Kaunas

S.Darius & S.Girenas Sport Cente, Kaunas

=== Group B ===
Team	Pts	Pld	W	D	L	GF	GA	GD
(England) Baku United FC	9	3	3	0	0	16	1	+15
(Poland) Wisła Kraków	6	3	2	0	1	10	7	+3
(Albania) KS Ali Demi	3	3	1	0	2	6	9	-3
(Montenegro) KF Jedinstvo Bijelo Polje	0	3	0	0	3	0	15	-15

28 August 2013

KF Jedinstvo Bijelo Polje (Montenegro)	0–5 Match forfeited	(Albania) KS Ali Demi

Hala Widowiskowo-Sportowa, Bochnia

28 August 2013

Wisła Kraków (Poland)	5–0	(Albania) KS Ali Demi

Hala Widowiskowo-Sportowa, Bochnia

29 August 2013

Baku United FC (England)	5–0 Match forfeited	(Montenegro) KF Jedinstvo Bijelo Polje

Hala Widowiskowo-Sportowa, Bochnia

29 August 2013

KS Ali Demi (Albania)	1–4	(England) Baku United FC

Hala Widowiskowo-Sportowa, Bochnia

31 August 2013

KF Jedinstvo Bijelo Polje (Montenegro)	0–5 Match forfeited	(Poland) Wisła Kraków

Hala Widowiskowo-Sportowa, Bochnia

31 August 2013

Wisła Kraków (Poland)	0–7	(England) Baku United FC

Hala Widowiskowo-Sportowa, Bochnia

=== Group C ===
Team	Pts	Pld	W	D	L	GF	GA	GD
(Norway) Vegakameratene	7	3	2	1	0	10	5	+5
(Switzerland) Futsal Minerva	6	3	2	0	1	17	4	+13
(Austria) Stella Rossa Wien	4	3	1	1	1	13	13	0
(Turkey) Fırat Üniversitesi Elazığ	0	3	0	0	3	7	25	-18

28 August 2013

Vegakameratene (Norway)	6–2	(Turkey) Fırat Üniversitesi Elazığ

Hollgasse Hall, Vienna

28 August 2013

Stella Rossa Wien (Austria)	2–6	(Switzerland) Futsal Minerva

Hollgasse Hall, Vienna

29 August 2013

Futsal Minerva (Switzerland)	1–2	(Norway) Vegakameratene

Hollgasse Hall, Vienna

29 August 2013

Stella Rossa Wien (Austria)	9–5	(Turkey) Fırat Üniversitesi Elazığ

Hollgasse Hall, Vienna

31 August 2013

Fırat Üniversitesi Elazığ (Turkey)	0–10	(Switzerland) Futsal Minerva

Hollgasse Hall, Vienna

31 August 2013

Vegakameratene (Norway)	2–2	(Austria) Stella Rossa Wien

Hollgasse Hall, Vienna

=== Group D ===
Team	Pts	Pld	W	D	L	GF	GA	GD
(Bosnia and Herzegovina) KMF Tango Sarajevo	6	2	2	0	0	18	3	+15
(Israel) ASA Ben Gurion	3	2	1	0	1	10	8	+2
(Wales) Wrexham Futsal Club	0	2	0	0	2	0	17	-17

27 August 2013

Wrexham Futsal Club (Wales)	0–10	(Bosnia and Herzegovina) KMF Tango Sarajevo

Cardiff House of Sport II, Cardiff

28 August 2013

KMF Tango Sarajevo (Bosnia and Herzegovina)	8–3	(Israel) ASA Ben Gurion

Cardiff House of Sport II, Cardiff

29 August 2013

ASA Ben Gurion (Israel)	7–0	(Wales) Wrexham Futsal Club

Cardiff House of Sport II, Cardiff

=== Group E ===
Team	Pts	Pld	W	D	L	GF	GA	GD
(Bulgaria) FC Grand Pro Varna	9	3	3	0	0	17	0	+17
(North Macedonia) KMF Železarec Skopje	6	3	2	0	1	17	4	+13
(Andorra) FC Encamp	3	3	1	0	2	12	18	-6
(Armenia) Shahumyan Futsal	0	3	0	0	3	5	29	-24

28 August 2013

KMF Železarec Skopje (North Macedonia)	4–2	(Andorra) FC Encamp

SOK-Kamchia, Varna

28 August 2013

FC Grand Pro Varna (Bulgaria)	6–0	(Armenia) Shahumyan Futsal

SOK-Kamchia, Varna

29 August 2013

Shahumyan Futsal (Armenia)	1–13	(North Macedonia) KMF Železarec Skopje

SOK-Kamchia, Varna

29 August 2013

FC Grand Pro Varna (Bulgaria)	10–0	(Andorra) FC Encamp

SOK-Kamchia, Varna

31 August 2013

FC Encamp (Andorra)	10–4	(Armenia) Shahumyan Futsal

SOK-Kamchia, Varna

31 August 2013

KMF Železarec Skopje (North Macedonia)	0–1	(Bulgaria) FC Grand Pro Varna

SOK-Kamchia, Varna

=== Group F ===
Team	Pts	Pld	W	D	L	GF	GA	GD
(Belarus) MFK VitEn Vitebsk	9	3	3	0	0	20	6	+14
(Republic of Ireland) Eden College Futsal	4	3	1	1	1	7	7	0
(Sweden) Göteborg Futsal Club	4	3	1	1	1	10	12	-2
(Scotland) Perth Saltires	0	3	0	0	3	6	18	-12

28 August 2013

MFK VitEn Vitebsk (Belarus)	11–2	(Scotland) Perth Saltires

Lisebergshallen, Gothenburg

28 August 2013

Göteborg Futsal Club (Sweden)	3–3	(Republic of Ireland) Eden College Futsal

Lisebergshallen, Gothenburg

29 August 2013

Eden College Futsal (Republic of Ireland)	2–4	(Belarus) MFK VitEn Vitebsk

Lisebergshallen, Gothenburg

29 August 2013

Göteborg Futsal Club (Sweden)	5–4	(Scotland) Perth Saltires

Lisebergshallen, Gothenburg

31 August 2013

Perth Saltires (Scotland)	0–2	(Republic of Ireland) Eden College Futsal

Lisebergshallen, Gothenburg

31 August 2013

MFK VitEn Vitebsk (Belarus)	5–2	(Sweden) Göteborg Futsal Club

Lisebergshallen, Gothenburg

=== Group G ===
Team	Pts	Pld	W	D	L	GF	GA	GD
(Germany) Hamburg Panthers	7	3	2	1	0	16	6	+10
(Malta) Hibernians FC	4	3	1	1	1	7	11	-4
(Denmark) JB Futsal Gentofte	3	3	1	0	2	8	12	-4
(Finland) FS Ilves Tampere	2	3	0	2	1	6	8	-2

28 August 2013

Hamburg Panthers (Germany)	7–2	(Malta) Hibernians FC

Pirkkahalli, Tampere

28 August 2013

FS Ilves Tampere (Finland)	2–4	(Denmark) JB Futsal Gentofte

Pirkkahalli, Tampere

29 August 2013

JB Futsal Gentofte (Denmark)	2–7	(Germany) Hamburg Panthers

Pirkkahalli, Tampere

29 August 2013

FS Ilves Tampere (Finland)	2–2	(Malta) Hibernians FC

Pirkkahalli, Tampere

31 August 2013

Hibernians FC (Malta)	3–2	(Denmark) JB Futsal Gentofte

Pirkkahalli, Tampere

31 August 2013

Hamburg Panthers (Germany)	2–2	(Finland) FS Ilves Tampere

Pirkkahalli, Tampere

=== Group H ===
Team	Pts	Pld	W	D	L	GF	GA	GD
(Greece) Athina '90	6	2	2	0	0	12	4	+8
(Iceland) Víkingur Ólafsvík	3	2	1	0	1	10	13	-3
(Estonia) FC Anzhi Tallinn	0	2	0	0	2	9	14	-5

27 August 2013

Víkingur Ólafsvík (Iceland)	8–7	(Estonia) FC Anzhi Tallinn

Ithrottahus Snæfellsbæjar, Ólafsvík

28 August 2013

FC Anzhi Tallinn (Estonia)	2–6	(Greece) Athina '90

Ithrottahus Snæfellsbæjar, Ólafsvík

29 August 2013

Athina '90 (Greece)	6–2	(Iceland) Víkingur Ólafsvík

Ithrottahus Snæfellsbæjar, Ólafsvík

== Main round ==
Following the preliminary round draw, the seventeen teams allocated in the main round pot and the seven group winners were distributed into six groups of four. Matches are set to take place between 1 and 5 October, hosted by a selected club in each group, which is highlighted with italics. The top two teams in each group will join the four highest-ranked clubs, that are already in the elite round after received bye for the early stage of the tournament.

=== Group 1 ===
Team	Pts	Pld	W	D	L	GF	GA	GD
(Belarus) MFK VitEn Vitebsk	7	3	2	1	0	12	6	+6
(Slovakia) Slov-Matic Bratislava	6	3	2	0	1	20	7	+13
(Latvia) FK Nikars Riga	4	3	1	1	1	10	9	+1
(Germany) Hamburg Panthers	0	3	0	0	3	4	24	-20

3 October 2013

Slov-Matic Bratislava (Slovakia)	14–1	(Germany) Hamburg Panthers
	Report

Olimpiskais Sporta Centrs, Riga
Attendance: 305

3 October 2013

FK Nikars Riga (Latvia)	3–3	(Belarus) MFK VitEn Vitebsk
	Report

Olimpiskais Sporta Centrs, Riga
Attendance: 610

4 October 2013

MFK VitEn Vitebsk (Belarus)	3–2	(Slovakia) Slov-Matic Bratislava
	Report

Olimpiskais Sporta Centrs, Riga
Attendance: 215

4 October 2013

FK Nikars Riga (Latvia)	4–2	(Germany) Hamburg Panthers
	Report

Olimpiskais Sporta Centrs, Riga
Attendance: 526

6 October 2013

Hamburg Panthers (Germany)	1–6	(Belarus) MFK VitEn Vitebsk
	Report

Olimpiskais Sporta Centrs, Riga
Attendance: 89

6 October 2013

Slov-Matic Bratislava (Slovakia)	4–3	(Latvia) FK Nikars Riga
	Report

Olimpiskais Sporta Centrs, Riga
Attendance: 700

=== Group 2 ===
Team	Pts	Pld	W	D	L	GF	GA	GD
(Hungary) Győri ETO FC	9	3	3	0	0	12	3	+9
(Bosnia and Herzegovina) KMF Tango Sarajevo	4	3	1	1	1	10	8	+2
(Georgia (country)) Iberia Star Tbilisi	4	3	1	1	1	3	4	-1
(Bulgaria) FC Grand Pro Varna	0	3	0	0	3	5	15	-10

1 October 2013

Iberia Star Tbilisi (Georgia (country))	2–1	(Bulgaria) FC Grand Pro Varna

Magvassy Mihály Sports Hall, Győr

1 October 2013

Győri ETO FC (Hungary)	4–2	(Bosnia and Herzegovina) KMF Tango Sarajevo

Magvassy Mihály Sports Hall, Győr

2 October 2013

KMF Tango Sarajevo (Bosnia and Herzegovina)	0–0	(Georgia (country)) Iberia Star Tbilisi

Magvassy Mihály Sports Hall, Győr

2 October 2013

Győri ETO FC (Hungary)	5–0	(Bulgaria) FC Grand Pro Varna

Magvassy Mihály Sports Hall, Győr

4 October 2013

FC Grand Pro Varna (Bulgaria)	4–8	(Bosnia and Herzegovina) KMF Tango Sarajevo

Magvassy Mihály Sports Hall, Győr

4 October 2013

Iberia Star Tbilisi (Georgia (country))	1–3	(Hungary) Győri ETO FC

Magvassy Mihály Sports Hall, Győr

=== Group 3 ===
Team	Pts	Pld	W	D	L	GF	GA	GD
(Kazakhstan) Tulpar Karagandy	5	3	1	2	0	10	5	+5
(Ukraine) Lokomotiv Kharkov	4	3	1	1	1	10	9	+1
(Italy) Marca Futsal	4	3	1	1	1	7	6	+1
(France) Sporting Club de Paris	3	3	1	0	2	7	14	-7

2 October 2013

Marca Futsal (Italy)	4–0	(France) Sporting Club de Paris

Palace of Sport Lokomotiv, Kharkiv

2 October 2013

Lokomotiv Kharkov (Ukraine)	2–2	(Kazakhstan) Tulpar Karagandy

Palace of Sport Lokomotiv, Kharkiv

3 October 2013

Tulpar Karagandy (Kazakhstan)	2–2	(Italy) Marca Futsal

Palace of Sport Lokomotiv, Kharkiv

3 October 2013

Lokomotiv Kharkov (Ukraine)	4–6	(France) Sporting Club de Paris

Palace of Sport Lokomotiv, Kharkiv

5 October 2013

Sporting Club de Paris (France)	1–6	(Kazakhstan) Tulpar Karagandy

Palace of Sport Lokomotiv, Kharkiv

5 October 2013

Marca Futsal (Italy)	1–4	(Ukraine) Lokomotiv Kharkov

Palace of Sport Lokomotiv, Kharkiv

=== Group 4 ===
Team	Pts	Pld	W	D	L	GF	GA	GD
(Czech Republic) FK EP Chrudim	7	3	2	1	0	13	7	+6
(Slovenia) FC Litija	6	3	2	0	1	13	8	+5
(England) Baku United FC	4	3	1	1	1	6	6	0
(Cyprus) Omonia	0	3	0	0	3	1	12	-11

1 October 2013

FK EP Chrudim (Czech Republic)	3–3	(England) Baku United FC

Tassos Papadopoulos, Nicosia

1 October 2013

Omonia (Cyprus)	1–6	(Slovenia) FC Litija

Tassos Papadopoulos, Nicosia

2 October 2013

FC Litija (Slovenia)	4–5	(Czech Republic) FK EP Chrudim

Tassos Papadopoulos, Nicosia

2 October 2013

Omonia (Cyprus)	0–1	(England) Baku United FC

Tassos Papadopoulos, Nicosia

4 October 2013

Baku United FC (England)	2–3	(Slovenia) FC Litija

Tassos Papadopoulos, Nicosia

4 October 2013

FK EP Chrudim (Czech Republic)	5–0	(Cyprus) Omonia

Tassos Papadopoulos, Nicosia

=== Group 5 ===
Team	Pts	Pld	W	D	L	GF	GA	GD
(Serbia) Ekonomac Kragujevac	9	3	3	0	0	15	3	+12
(Netherlands) CF Eindhoven	6	3	2	0	1	9	10	-1
(Croatia) MNK Nacional Zagreb	3	3	1	0	2	7	9	-2
(Norway) Vegakameratene	0	3	0	0	3	1	10	-9

2 October 2013

Ekonomac Kragujevac (Serbia)	4–1	(Croatia) MNK Nacional Zagreb

Sports Hall Jezero, Kragujevac

2 October 2013

CF Eindhoven (Netherlands)	3–0	(Norway) Vegakameratene

Sports Hall Jezero, Kragujevac

3 October 2013

Ekonomac Kragujevac (Serbia)	5–1	(Norway) Vegakameratene

Sports Hall Jezero, Kragujevac

3 October 2013

MNK Nacional Zagreb (Croatia)	4–5	(Netherlands) CF Eindhoven

Sports Hall Jezero, Kragujevac

5 October 2013

Vegakameratene (Norway)	0–2	(Croatia) MNK Nacional Zagreb

Sports Hall Jezero, Kragujevac

5 October 2013

CF Eindhoven (Netherlands)	1–6	(Serbia) Ekonomac Kragujevac

Sports Hall Jezero, Kragujevac

=== Group 6 ===
Team	Pts	Pld	W	D	L	GF	GA	GD
(Azerbaijan) Araz Naxçivan	7	3	2	1	0	11	5	+6
(Romania) City'US Târgu Mureş	5	3	1	2	0	16	15	+1
(Belgium) Châtelineau Futsal	4	3	1	1	1	14	10	+4
(Greece) Athina '90	0	3	0	0	3	8	19	-11

2 October 2013

Araz Naxçivan (Azerbaijan)	5–1	(Greece) Athina '90

Târgu Mureș Sports Hall, Târgu Mureș

2 October 2013

City'US Târgu Mureş (Romania)	6–6	(Belgium) Châtelineau Futsal

Târgu Mureș Sports Hall, Târgu Mureș

3 October 2013

Châtelineau Futsal (Belgium)	1–3	(Azerbaijan) Araz Naxçivan

Târgu Mureș Sports Hall, Târgu Mureș

3 October 2013

City'US Târgu Mureş (Romania)	7–6	(Greece) Athina '90

Târgu Mureș Sports Hall, Târgu Mureș

5 October 2013

Athina '90 (Greece)	1–7	(Belgium) Châtelineau Futsal

Târgu Mureș Sports Hall, Târgu Mureș

5 October 2013

Araz Naxçivan (Azerbaijan)	3–3	(Romania) City'US Târgu Mureş

Târgu Mureș Sports Hall, Târgu Mureș

== Elite round ==
=== Group A ===
Team	Pts	Pld	W	D	L	GF	GA	GD
(Spain) FC Barcelona	9	3	3	0	0	20	3	+17
(Ukraine) Lokomotiv Kharkov	6	3	2	0	1	7	8	-1
(Czech Republic) FK EP Chrudim	3	3	1	0	2	12	8	4
(Romania) City'US Târgu Mureş	0	3	0	0	3	2	22	-20

=== Group B ===
Team	Pts	Pld	W	D	L	GF	GA	GD
(Russia) Dinamo Moskva	9	3	3	0	0	18	3	+15
(Serbia) Ekonomac Kragujevac	6	3	2	0	1	8	9	-1
(Slovakia) Slov-Matic Bratislava	3	3	1	0	2	7	14	-7
(Slovenia) FC Litija	0	3	0	0	3	7	14	-7

=== Group C ===
Team	Pts	Pld	W	D	L	GF	GA	GD
(Kazakhstan) Kairat Almaty	9	3	3	0	0	25	1	+24
(Kazakhstan) Tulpar Karagandy	6	3	2	0	1	13	12	+1
(Belarus) MFK VitEn Vitebsk	1	3	0	1	2	6	17	-11
(Bosnia and Herzegovina) Tango Sarajevo	1	3	0	1	2	7	21	-14

=== Group D ===
Team	Pts	Pld	W	D	L	GF	GA	GD
(Azerbaijan) Araz Naxçivan	9	3	3	0	0	17	6	+11
(Portugal) Sporting Clube	6	3	2	0	1	15	8	+7
(Hungary) Győri ETO FC	3	3	1	0	2	8	13	-5
(Netherlands) CF Eindhoven	0	3	0	0	3	6	19	-13

21 November 2013
18:30 GMT

Araz Naxçivan (Azerbaijan)	6–3	(Netherlands) CF Eindhoven
Edu; Amadeu; Biro Jade; Borisov; Rafael; Augusto	1	Gambarov (o.g.); Bali; El Attabi

Almada Sports Hall, Almada
Attendance: 2400
Referee: (England) Marc Birkett

21 November 2013
20:30 GMT

Sporting Clube (Portugal)	6–1	(Hungary) Győri ETO FC
Marcelinho; Pedro Cary; Divanei; Alex; Deo	2	Harnisch

Almada Sports Hall, Almada
Attendance: 2400
Referee: (Belgium) Pascal Lemal

22 November 2013
18:30 GMT

Győri ETO FC (Hungary)	0–5	(Azerbaijan) Araz Naxçivan
	3

Almada Sports Hall, Almada
Attendance: 2400

22 November 2013
20:30 GMT

Sporting Clube (Portugal)	6–1	(Netherlands) CF Eindhoven
Divanei; Marcelinho; Deo; Caio Japa; Alex	4	Adem Koçak

Almada Sports Hall, Almada
Attendance: 2400
Referee: (Croatia) Saša Tomić

24 November 2013
14:30 GMT

CF Eindhoven (Netherlands)	2–7	(Hungary) Győri ETO FC
	5

Almada Sports Hall, Almada
Attendance: 2400

24 November 2013
17:00 GMT

Araz Naxçivan (Azerbaijan)	6–3	(Portugal) Sporting Clube
Fabiano; Borisov; Amadeu; Felipe	6	Divanei; Deo; Alex

Almada Sports Hall, Almada
Attendance: 2400

== Final four ==
The following teams have qualified for the final four round:

- (Spain) FC Barcelona
- (Russia) Dinamo Moskva
- (Kazakhstan) Kairat Almaty
- (Azerbaijan) Araz Naxçivan

Draw for the semi-finals was held on 12 March in Hilton Hotel in Baku.

Semi-finals
24 April–Baku
(Kazakhstan) Kairat Almaty	1
(Russia) Dinamo Moskva	2
24 April–Baku
(Azerbaijan) Araz Naxçivan	4 (2)
(Spain) FC Barcelona (p.s.o.)	4 (4)

Final
26 April–Baku
(Russia) Dinamo Moskva	2
(Spain) FC Barcelona	5
Third place
26 April–Baku
(Kazakhstan) Kairat Almaty	4
(Azerbaijan) Araz Naxçivan	6

=== Semifinals ===
All times are (UTC+2).

24 April 2014	Kairat Almaty (Kazakhstan)	1–2	(Russia) Dinamo Moskva	Sarhadchi Olympic Center, Baku
15:30	Baron 31'	Report	Nando 25'; Fernandinho 39'	Referee: Marc Birkett (ENG)

24 April 2014	Araz Naxçivan (Azerbaijan)	4–4 (a.e.t.) (2–4 p)	(Spain) FC Barcelona	Sarhadchi Olympic Center, Baku
18:00	Rafael 3'; Fabiano 28'; Foglia 40'; Amadeu 49'	Report	Igor 12'; Aicardo 22', 27'; Dyego 46'	Referee: Alessandro Malfer (ITA)
	Penalties
	Fabiano (penalty missed); Amadeu (penalty scored); Rafael (penalty scored); Davi (penalty missed)		(penalty scored) Wilde; (penalty scored) Lin; (penalty scored) Saad; (penalty missed) Lozano; (penalty scored) Torras

=== 3rd and 4th place ===
26 April 2014	Kairat Almaty (Kazakhstan)	4–6	(Azerbaijan) Araz Naxçivan	Sarhadchi Olympic Center, Baku
16:00	Baron 16'; Fumaça 18', 34'; Café 30'	Report	Amadeu 27'; Foglia 28', 32'; Fabiano 37'; Augusto 39'; Edu 39'

=== Final ===
26 April 2014	Dinamo Moskva (Russia)	2–5 (a.e.t.)	(Spain) FC Barcelona	Sarhadchi Olympic Center, Baku
18:30	Romulo 10'; Tatù 33'	Report	Gabriel 23'; Dyego 30'; Fernandão 41'; Lozano 50'; Paco Sedano 50'	Attendance: 1550

UEFA Futsal Cup
2013–14 Winners

FC Barcelona
2nd Title
