= 2026–27 UEFA Futsal Champions League =

41st edition of top European men's futsal competition

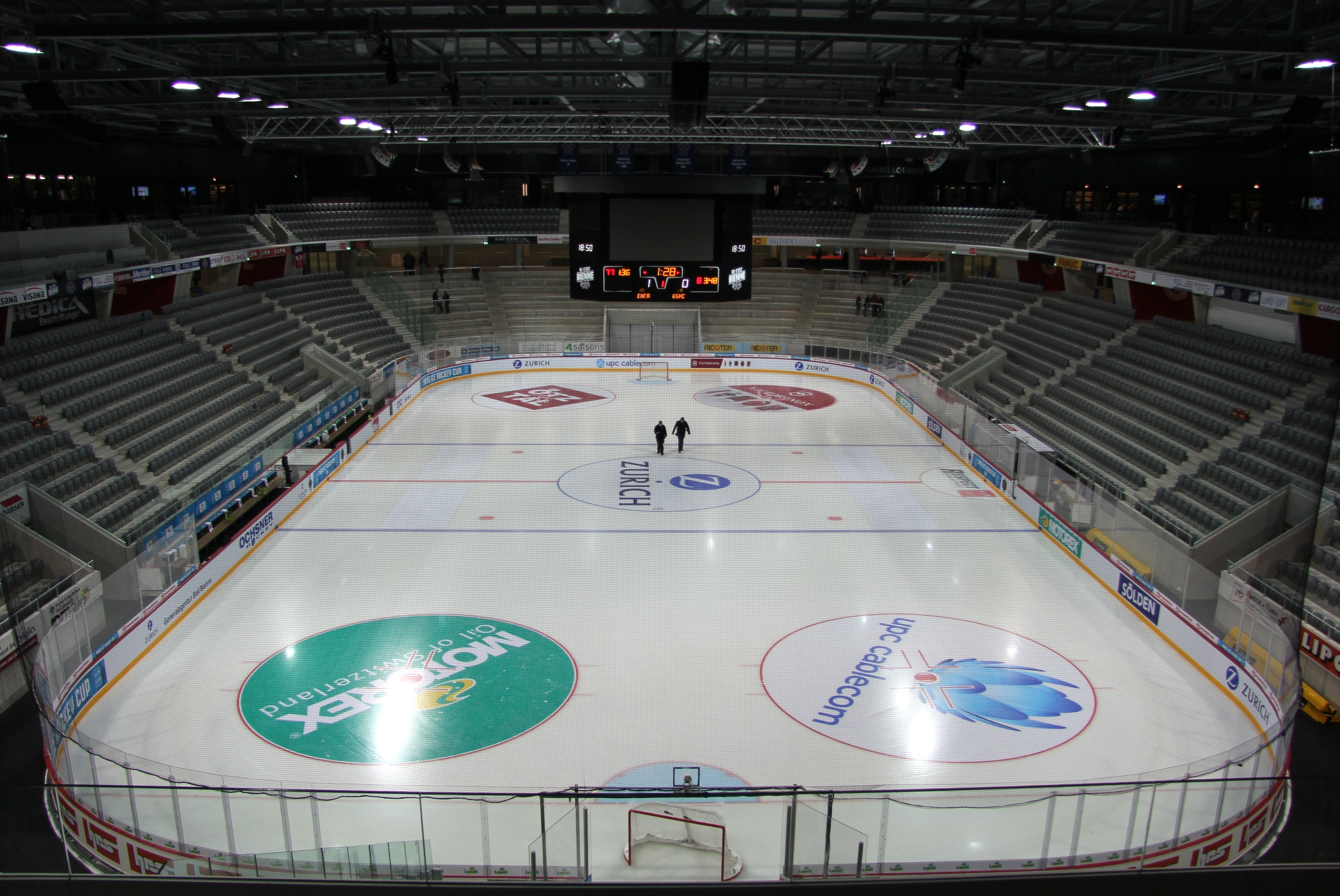
- Tissot Arena in Biel/Bienne will host the finals

Tournament details
- Dates: Qualifying rounds: 25 August 2026 – 19 February 2027; Final tournament: 6–9 May 2027
- Teams: Final tournament: 4 Total: 56 (from 52 associations)

Tournament statistics
- Matches played: 96
- Goals scored: 707 (7.36 per match)
- Top scorer(s): Máté Suscsák ( (Hungary) Újpest) (11 goals)
- All statistics correct as of 1 November 2026.

The 2026–27 UEFA Futsal Champions League is the 41st edition of Europe's premier club futsal tournament, and the 26th edition organized by UEFA. It is also the ninth edition since the tournament was rebranded from "UEFA Futsal Cup" to UEFA Futsal Champions League.

Sporting CP are the title holders.

== Association team allocation ==
A total of 56 teams from 52 of the 55 UEFA member associations participate in the 2026–27 UEFA Futsal Champions League. The association ranking based on the UEFA futsal national team coefficients was used to determine the number of participating teams for each association:

- The top three-ranked associations have two teams qualify.
- The winners of the 2025–26 UEFA Futsal Champions League qualify automatically and its association can also enter a second team. If the title-holders' association is among the top three-ranked associations, the 4th ranked association is also entitled to enter a second team.
- The remaining associations have one team qualify.

For this season, the top three-ranked associations are Portugal, Spain, and Kazakhstan. As the title holders are from Portugal, the 4th ranked association, Ukraine, can also enter two teams, after UEFA's decision to exclude Russian clubs from all UEFA competitions due to the 2022 Russian invasion of Ukraine.

=== Distribution ===
For the 2026–27 UEFA Futsal Champions League, the clubs' entry round was determined by their UEFA futsal club coefficients, which took into account their performance from the previous three seasons.

Access list for 2026–27 UEFA Futsal Champions League
		Teams entering in this round	Teams advancing from the previous round
Preliminary round (32 teams)		32 teams ranked 25–56	
Main round	Path A (16 teams)	Title holders; 15 teams ranked 1–11 and 16–19	
Main round	Path B (16 teams)	8 teams ranked 12–15 and 20–23	8 group winners from the preliminary round
Elite round (16 teams)			4 group winners from main round path A; 4 group runners-up from main round path A; 4 group third-placed teams from main round path A; 4 group winners from main round path B
Final tournament (4 teams)			4 Quarter-final winners from elite round

=== Teams ===
Below are the participating teams of the 2025–26 UEFA Futsal Champions League (with their ranking among participating teams), grouped by their starting round and path for the main round.

Main round Path A
Team	Rank
(Spain) Barça	1
(Portugal) Sporting CP	TH
(Kazakhstan) Kairat	2
(Portugal) SL Benfica	3
(Spain) ElPozo Murcia	4
(Kazakhstan) Futsal Club Semey	5
(France) Étoile Lavalloise	6
(Belgium) Anderlecht	7
(Ukraine) HIT Kyiv	8
(Croatia) MNK Olmissum	9
(Slovakia) MIMEL Lučenec	10
(Romania) Clubul Sportiv United Galați	11
(Switzerland) Futsal Minerva	16
(Latvia) TFK Beitar	17
(Belarus) Stalitsa Minsk	18
(Netherlands) Tigers Roermond	19

Main round Path B
Team	Rank
(Poland) Piast Gliwice	12
(Serbia) KMF Loznica	13
(Lithuania) Kauno Žalgiris	14
(Malta) Luxol St Andrews	15
(Italy) L84 Torino	20
(Azerbaijan) Araz Naxçivan	21
(Ukraine) Athletic Futsal	22
(Luxembourg) Differdange 03	23

Preliminary round
Team	Rank
(Denmark) Hjørring Futsal Klub	24
(Slovenia) NK Vrhnika	25
(Bosnia and Herzegovina) MNK Buba Mara	26
(Czech Republic) FK Chrudim	27
(Kosovo) Drenica Futsal	28
(Greece) Doukas SAC	29
(Finland) Futsal Mad Max	30
(Germany) TSV Weilimdorf	31
(Hungary) Újpest	32
(Georgia (country)) MFC CIU	33
(Moldova) Clic Chișinău	34
(Republic of Ireland) Blue Magic Dublin	35
(Montenegro) Studentski Dom	36
(Albania) Tirana Futsal	37
(Austria) Futsal Club Graz	38
(Estonia) FC Tallinn B.P.	39
(San Marino) SS Murata	40
(Sweden) Futsal Club Kalmar	41
(North Macedonia) KMF Proekt	42
(Bulgaria) Amigo Northwest	43
(Cyprus) APOEL Futsal	44
(Armenia) Unisport Futsal Club	45
(Norway) Utleira	46
(Northern Ireland) Sparta Belfast	47
(Scotland) PYF Saltires	48
(England) London Genesis Futsal	49
(Andorra) Rànger's	50
(Israel) Maccabi Netanya Futsal	51
(Iceland) KM Reykjavík	52
(Gibraltar) Lynx Futsal Club	53
(Turkey) Sakarya Karasu	54
(Wales) Futsal Club Cardiff	55

== Format ==
The tournament has a mini-tournament format consisting of three qualifying rounds and the final tournament. The qualifying rounds consisted of the following stages:

- Preliminary round: 32 teams entering this round were divided into eight groups of four teams, with the group winners advancing to the next round.
- Main round:
  - Path A: 16 teams entering this round were divided into four groups of four teams, with the group winners, runners-up, and third-placed teams advancing to the next round.
  - Path B: 8 teams that entered in this round and the 8 teams advancing from the preliminary round were divided into four groups of four teams, with the group winners advancing to the next round.
- Round of 16: 16 teams advancing from the main round were drawn into eight home-away matches, with winners advancing to the next round. The top two teams from each Path A group are seeded.
- Quarter-finals: Eight winners from the previous round are drawn into four home-away matches, with winners advancing to the Final tournament.

The final tournament is played at a centralized location and consists of single-legged semi-finals, a third-place play-off, and a final. If scores were level at the end of normal time, extra time was played, followed by a penalty shoot-out if the scores remained tied.

=== Tiebreakers ===
Teams were ranked according to points (3 points for a win, 1 point for a draw, 0 points for a loss). If two or more teams were tied on points, the following tiebreaking criteria were applied, in the order given, to determine the rankings (see Article 14 Equality of points – mini-tournaments, Regulations of the UEFA Futsal Champions League):

1. Points in head-to-head matches among the tied teams;
2. Goal difference in head-to-head matches among the tied teams;
3. Goals scored in head-to-head matches among the tied teams;
4. If more than two teams were tied, and after applying all head-to-head criteria above, a subset of teams are still tied, all head-to-head criteria above were reapplied exclusively to this subset of teams;
5. Goal difference in all group matches;
6. Goals scored in all group matches;
7. Disciplinary points (direct red card = 3 points; double yellow card = 3 points; single yellow card = 1 point);
8. UEFA futsal club coefficients.

If two teams that have the same number of points and have scored and conceded the same number of goals play their last mini-tournament match against each other and are still equal at the end of that match, their final rankings are determined by a penalty shoot-out provided that no other teams within the group have the same number of points on completion of the mini-tournament. This procedure is only necessary if a ranking of the teams is required to determine the team which qualifies for the next stage.

== Schedule ==
The schedule of the competition was as follows (all draws were held at the UEFA headquarters in Nyon, Switzerland).

Schedule for 2026–27 UEFA Futsal Champions League
Phase	Round	Draw	Dates
Qualifying stage	Preliminary round	8 July 2026	25–30 August 2026
Final tournament	Main round	8 July 2026	27 October – 1 November 2026
Final tournament	Round of 16	4 November 2026	23 November 2026 (first leg); 4 December 2026 (second leg)
Final tournament	Quarter-finals	4 November 2026	8 February 2027 (first leg); 19 February 2027 (second leg)
Final tournament	Semi-finals	4 November 2026	6 or 7 May 2027
Final tournament	Final	4 November 2026	8 or 9 May 2027

== Preliminary round ==
The draw for the preliminary round was held on 8 July 2026, 14:00 CET. The preliminary round will be played from 25 to 30 August 2026. The winners of each group will progress to the main round, Path B.

Times are CEST, as listed by UEFA (local times, if different, are in parentheses).

=== Seeding ===
A total of 32 teams play in the preliminary round. Seeding of teams was based on their 2025 UEFA futsal club coefficients. Eight teams were pre-selected as hosts and were first drawn from a separate pot to their corresponding seeding position. The remaining teams were then drawn from their respective pots to their corresponding seeding position. Teams from Armenia & Azerbaijan, Kosovo & Bosnia and Herzegovina, Kosovo & Serbia, and Ukraine & Belarus could not be drawn into the same group.

Seeding position 1	Seeding position 2	Seeding position 3	Seeding position 4
(Denmark) Hjørring Futsal Klub; (Slovenia) NK Vrhnika; (Bosnia and Herzegovina) MNK Buba Mara (H); (Czech Republic) FK Chrudim; (Kosovo) Drenica Futsal; (Greece) Doukas SAC (H); (Finland) Futsal Mad Max; (Germany) TSV Weilimdorf	(Hungary) Újpest (H); (Georgia (country)) MFC CIU; (Moldova) Clic Chișinău; (Republic of Ireland) Blue Magic Dublin; (Montenegro) Studentski Dom (H); (Albania) Tirana Futsal (H); (Austria) Futsal Club Graz (H); (Estonia) FC Tallinn B.P.	(San Marino) SS Murata; (Sweden) Futsal Club Kalmar; (North Macedonia) KMF Proekt; (Bulgaria) Amigo Northwest (H); (Cyprus) APOEL Futsal; (Armenia) Unisport Futsal Club (H); (Norway) Utleira; (Northern Ireland) Sparta Belfast	(Scotland) PYF Saltires; (England) London Genesis Futsal; (Andorra) Rànger's; (Israel) Maccabi Netanya Futsal; (Iceland) KM Reykjavík; (Gibraltar) Lynx Futsal Club; (Turkey) Sakarya Karasu; (Wales) Futsal Club Cardiff

Notes

- H – Mini-tournament hosts

=== Group A ===
Pos	Team	Pld	W	D	L	GF	GA	GD	Pts	Qualification
1	(Austria) Futsal Club Graz (H)	3	2	1	0	10	2	+8	7	Advance to main round
2	(Slovenia) Vrhnika	3	1	2	0	13	6	+7	5	
3	(North Macedonia) KMF Proekt	3	0	2	1	6	12	−6	2	
4	(Israel) Maccabi Netanya	3	0	1	2	4	13	−9	1	

Source: UEFA
Rules for classification: Tiebreakers
(H) Hosts
26 August 2026
17:30

Vrhnika (Slovenia)	8–1	(Israel) Maccabi Netanya
G. Trdin 17'55, 22'59; Novak 23'55, 32'08; Letnar 26'57, 27'08; Zupančič 35'52; Frank 37'34	Report	Cohen 7'51

Bluebox Arena, Graz
Referee: Olga Pavlyut (Belarus), Laurentiu Ilie (San Marino)
26 August 2026
20:00

KMF Proekt (North Macedonia)	0–6	(Austria) Futsal Club Graz
	Report	Bukovec 0'20, 18'59, 30'09; Jurić 31'13; Kovacic 34'17, 35'34

Bluebox Arena, Graz
Referee: Srdjan Mihajlovic (Serbia), Joao Pedro Pereira Sinval (Portugal)

27 August 2026
17:30

KMF Proekt (North Macedonia)	3–3	(Slovenia) Vrhnika
Blagojevski 10'34; Stojanov 33'02; Krstevski 33'56	Report	Rems 5'22, 19'50 (pen.); Berzelak 38'43

Bluebox Arena, Graz
Referee: Laurentiu Ilie (San Marino), Srdjan Mihajlovic (Serbia)
27 August 2026
20:00

Futsal Club Graz (Austria)	2–0	(Israel) Maccabi Netanya
Fideršek 19'37; Kovacic 28'10	Report

Bluebox Arena, Graz
Referee: Joao Pedro Pereira Sinval (Portugal), Olga Pavlyut (Belarus)

29 August 2026
17:30

Maccabi Netanya (Israel)	3–3	(North Macedonia) KMF Proekt
Sayag 8'23; Lila 20'16 (pen.); Gnieslaw 25'05	Report	Dimitriev 10'49; B. Janev 22'13; Blagojevski 28'30

Bluebox Arena, Graz
Referee: Srdjan Mihajlovic (Serbia), Laurentiu Ilie (San Marino)
29 August 2026
20:00

Futsal Club Graz (Austria)	2–2	(Slovenia) Vrhnika
Crnčević 16'58, 19'45	Report	Frank 1'56; Muratagić 13'30

Bluebox Arena, Graz
Referee: Joao Pedro Pereira Sinval (Portugal), Olga Pavlyut (Belarus)

=== Group B ===
Pos	Team	Pld	W	D	L	GF	GA	GD	Pts	Qualification
1	(Denmark) Hjørring	3	2	0	1	22	14	+8	6 (Note: Ranked on goal difference in head-to-head matches: Hjørring +1, Tirana 0, APOEL −1)	Advance to main round
2	(Albania) Tirana Futsal (H)	3	2	0	1	22	14	+8	6	
3	(Cyprus) APOEL Futsal	3	2	0	1	24	14	+10	6	
4	(Wales) Cardiff	3	0	0	3	3	29	−26	0	

Source: UEFA
Rules for classification: Tiebreakers
(H) Hosts
Notes:
26 August 2026
17:00

Hjørring (Denmark)	9–2	(Wales) Cardiff
Andy Montoya 0'24; Dias Alves 2'32; Gantzhorn 12'28, 19'59; Winther 13'51, 29'17; Carpes 33'02; Winther 36'45; Kasumovic 38'12	Report	Jefferies 9'55, 23'45

Tirana Olympic Park, Tirana
Referee: Maximilian Alkofer (Germany), Gordon Mccabe (Scotland)
26 August 2026
20:45

APOEL Futsal (Cyprus)	6–8	(Albania) Tirana Futsal
Fagundes 0'33, 1'15, 11'14; Dos Santos Sousa 28'12; Tzakidis 30'49, 38'07	Report	Maxharraj 7'13; Selmanaj 10'59, 23'36; Muca 12'31; Limani 17'29; Kelmendi 18'45, 25'40; Alibegu 24'34

Tirana Olympic Park, Tirana
Referee: Alen Božič (Slovenia), Njegos Vucanovic (Austria)

27 August 2026
17:00

APOEL Futsal (Cyprus)	7–6	(Denmark) Hjørring
Pericleous 11'37; Kouloumbris 19'29 (pen.), 27'51, 33'16; Tacot 28'43; Tzakidis 36'28; Psilogenis 38'40	Report	Kasumovic 13'00, 21'33, 35'57; Dias Alves 18'08, 38'51; Carpes 37'47

Tirana Olympic Park, Tirana
Referee: Njegos Vucanovic (Austria), Maximilian Alkofer (Germany)
27 August 2026
20:45

Tirana Futsal (Albania)	9–1	(Wales) Cardiff
Maxharraj 0'52, 7'56, 10'32, 13'18, 23'13; Muca 9'15; Kelmendi 15'31; Plaku 18'45; Gjeci 28'27	Report	Jagpal 25'15

Tirana Olympic Park, Tirana
Referee: Gordon Mccabe (Scotland), Alen Božič (Slovenia)

29 August 2026
17:00

Cardiff (Wales)	0–11	(Cyprus) APOEL Futsal
	Report	Kouloumbris 15'00; Tzakidis 16'35, 36'53; Elkebbe 20'21; Fagundes 24'03; Tacot 25'02, 39'07; Dos Santos Sousa 27'23, 29'47; Ricardo Barros 34'23; Platis 37'40

Tirana Olympic Park, Tirana
Referee: Maximilian Alkofer (Germany), Gordon Mccabe (Scotland)
29 August 2026
20:45

Tirana Futsal (Albania)	5–7	(Denmark) Hjørring
Kryeziu 11'44; Alaj 14'14, 33'07, 35'15; Limani 26'32	Report	Gantzhorn 7'52; Kasumovic 17'14; Dias Alves 18'51, 23'55, 30'04; Lyngø 2'10; Carpes 32'46

Tirana Olympic Park, Tirana
Referee: Njegos Vucanovic (Austria), Alen Božič (Slovenia)

=== Group C ===
Pos	Team	Pld	W	D	L	GF	GA	GD	Pts	Qualification
1	(Bosnia and Herzegovina) Buba Mara (H)	3	2	1	0	20	9	+11	7	Advance to main round
2	(Georgia (country)) CIU	3	2	1	0	14	8	+6	7	
3	(Norway) Utleira	3	1	0	2	5	10	−5	3	
4	(Gibraltar) Lynx Futsal Club	3	0	0	3	6	18	−12	0	

Source: UEFA
Rules for classification: Tiebreakers
(H) Hosts
26 August 2026
17:00

CIU (Georgia (country))	7–3	(Gibraltar) Lynx Futsal Club
Kharatishvili 6'12; Chimakadze 7'22, 8'47, 26'36; Machitidze 9'43; Giorgaia 27'22; Kekelia 37'19	Report	Del Rio 2'53; Mateos Salguero 27'43; Mifsud 34'07

Gradska Sportska Dvorana Salih Omerčević, Cazin
Referee: Vasilios Christodoulis (Greece), Arlind Subashi (Albania)
26 August 2026
20:00

Utleira (Norway)	2–7	(Bosnia and Herzegovina) Buba Mara
Økland 7'14; Grunnvoll 39'46	Report	Ibrisimović 8'20; Gosto 10'09, 17'26, 29'21; Osredkar 23'23, 28'41; Pedro Silva 33'10

Gradska Sportska Dvorana Salih Omerčević, Cazin
Referee: Muhammed Furkan Saglam (Türkiye), Jose Miguel Silva Moreira (Portugal)

27 August 2026
17:00

Utleira (Norway)	1–3	(Georgia (country)) CIU
Andreassen 36'35 (pen.)	Report	Aslani 10'23; Roninho 15'05; Giorgaia 34'41

Gradska Sportska Dvorana Salih Omerčević, Cazin
Referee: Jose Miguel Silva Moreira (Portugal), Vasilios Christodoulis (Greece)
27 August 2026
20:00

Buba Mara (Bosnia and Herzegovina)	9–3	(Gibraltar) Lynx Futsal Club
Gosto 1'40; Bundavica 4'27, 26'15; Del Rio 12'24 (o.g.); Pedro Silva 12'39, 19'19; Perić 16'08; Prošić 17'43; Kadić 18'56	Report	Mateos Salguero 10'28, 15'48 (pen.); Doña Morales 30'12

Gradska Sportska Dvorana Salih Omerčević, Cazin
Referee: Arlind Subashi (Albania), Muhammed Furkan Saglam (Türkiye)

29 August 2026
17:00

Lynx Futsal Club (Gibraltar)	0–2	(Norway) Utleira
	Report	Andreassen 28'05; M. Johansen 37'30

Gradska Sportska Dvorana Salih Omerčević, Cazin
Referee: Arlind Subashi (Albania), Muhammed Furkan Saglam (Türkiye)
29 August 2026
20:00

Buba Mara (Bosnia and Herzegovina)	4–4	(Georgia (country)) CIU
Gosto 10'15 (pen.), 17'16 (pen.), 24'19 (pen.); Pedro Silva 30'33	Report	Kekelia 2'13, 25'08; Perić 10'22 (o.g.), 21'18 (o.g.)

Gradska Sportska Dvorana Salih Omerčević, Cazin
Referee: Jose Miguel Silva Moreira (Portugal), Vasilios Christodoulis (Greece)

=== Group D ===
Pos	Team	Pld	W	D	L	GF	GA	GD	Pts	Qualification
1	(Hungary) Újpest (H)	3	3	0	0	28	4	+24	9	Advance to main round
2	(Kosovo) Drenica Futsal	3	2	0	1	19	5	+14	6	
3	(Turkey) Sakarya Karasu	3	1	0	2	6	24	−18	3	
4	(San Marino) Murata	3	0	0	3	8	28	−20	0	

Source: UEFA
Rules for classification: Tiebreakers
(H) Hosts
25 August 2026
16:00

Drenica Futsal (Kosovo)	6–0	(Turkey) Sakarya Karasu
Luis Quintero 5'05, 33'01, 35'38; Gashi 10'44; Burak Uğurlu 19'36 (o.g.); Sanchez 22'13	Report

Amália Sterbinszky Sports Hall, Budapest
Referee: Aslan Galayev (Kazakhstan), Duncan McLullich (Scotland)
25 August 2026
19:00

Murata (San Marino)	2–11	(Hungary) Újpest
Mattioli 28'56, 35'50	Report	Hadzsi 0'17; Czerman 4'40, 15'46; Pál 19'48, 27'06; Rutai 24'59, 36'19; Moreira Alves 27'34, 28'22; Suscsák 31'30; Gasperoni 37'50 (o.g.)

Amália Sterbinszky Sports Hall, Budapest
Referee: Elwyn Rhys Parry (Wales), Vedran Marcinko (Bosnia and Herzegovina)

26 August 2026
16:00

Murata (San Marino)	1–11	(Kosovo) Drenica Futsal
Haxhijaj 25'16 (o.g.)	Report	Dervishaj 6'53, 39'02; Haxhijaj 9'14, 19'36; Cesarini 11'12 (o.g.); Ramadan 22'15; Xhinpvci 26'30; Diar 26'46, 38'17; Aliu 29'50; Sanchez 36'12

Amália Sterbinszky Sports Hall, Budapest
Referee: Vedran Marcinko (Bosnia and Herzegovina), Aslan Galayev (Kazakhstan)
26 August 2026
19:00

Újpest (Hungary)	13–0	(Turkey) Sakarya Karasu
Suscsák 0'20, 5'49, 21'04, 29'07, 30'54, 35'34; Moreira Alves 1'03, 36'27; Szalmás 11'33; Rutai 19'58, 39'48; Cardoso Alves 24'58; Bogdán 39'17	Report

Amália Sterbinszky Sports Hall, Budapest
Referee: Duncan McLullich (Scotland), Elwyn Rhys Parry (Wales)

28 August 2026
15:00

Sakarya Karasu (Turkey)	6–5	(San Marino) Murata
Orhan Ekşi 14'24, 28'14; Rıdvan Baydan 25'19; Yusuf Aygün 27'20; Talha Vardar 35'19; Sefa Yılmaz 37'50	Report	Belloni 6'58; Oguz Böke 13'33 (o.g.); Molinas 22'20, 39'46; Gasperoni 35'38

Amália Sterbinszky Sports Hall, Budapest
Referee: Vedran Marcinko (Bosnia and Herzegovina), Elwyn Rhys Parry (Wales)
28 August 2026
18:00

Újpest (Hungary)	4–2	(Kosovo) Drenica Futsal
Rutai 17'31; Vas 24'03; Cardoso Alves 36'32; Gémesi 38'45	Report	Pardo 32'46; Dervishaj 39'24

Amália Sterbinszky Sports Hall, Budapest
Referee: Amine El Hilali (Belgium), Duncan McLullich (Scotland)

=== Group E ===
Pos	Team	Pld	W	D	L	GF	GA	GD	Pts	Qualification
1	(Armenia) Unisport Futsal Club (H)	3	3	0	0	24	4	+20	9	Advance to main round
2	(Germany) Weilimdorf	3	2	0	1	22	8	+14	6	
3	(Estonia) FC Tallinn B.P.	3	1	0	2	9	14	−5	3	
4	(Iceland) KM Reykjavík	3	0	0	3	4	33	−29	0	

Source: UEFA
Rules for classification: Tiebreakers
(H) Hosts
26 August 2026
13:00

Weilimdorf (Germany)	13–1	(Iceland) KM Reykjavík
Redzepi 0'37, 1'00, 1'34, 17'09; Özden 5'00; Džindić 5'58, 21'13, 23'19, 32'05; Sözer 9'25, 36'40; Luis Barceló 26'37 (o.g.); Zovko 34'43	Report	Hafliðason 13'39

FFA Technical Center Academy, Yerevan
Referee: Besart Ismajli (Kosovo), Panagiotis Ntalas (Greece)
26 August 2026
17:00

FC Tallinn B.P. (Estonia)	1–5	(Armenia) Unisport Futsal Club
Er. Stüf 28'45	Report	Mashumyan 0'24; Melkonyan 7'58; Melikyan 21'48; Vitinho 23'52; Dermenjyan 36'10

FFA Technical Center Academy, Yerevan
Referee: Aliaksandr Auramau (Belarus), Dyon Koene (The Netherlands)

27 August 2026
13:00

FC Tallinn B.P. (Estonia)	2–7	(Germany) Weilimdorf
Vnukov 34'12; Keiber Quevedo 39'53	Report	Redzepi 0'52; Xydias 7'14; Džindić 24'01, 30'39, 31'58, 32'54; Zovko 33'33

FFA Technical Center Academy, Yerevan
Referee: Dyon Koene (The Netherlands), Besart Ismajli (Kosovo)
27 August 2026
17:00

Unisport Futsal Club (Armenia)	14–1	(Iceland) KM Reykjavík
Ramba 6'11, 21'51, 36'47; Mashumyan 8'17, 34'15; Manukyan 10'38, 18'35; Dermenjyan 13'27; Olguín 14'41 (o.g.); Melikyan 19'36; Vasilev 23'37; Galstyan 28'52; Melkonyan 34'04; Margaryan 37'57	Report	Unai Fernandez 29'45

FFA Technical Center Academy, Yerevan
Referee: Panagiotis Ntalas (Greece), Aliaksandr Auramau (Belarus)

29 August 2026
12:00

KM Reykjavík (Iceland)	2–6	(Estonia) FC Tallinn B.P.
Olguín 15'17, 19'35	Report	Vnukov 4'32, 16'24; Rodriguez Sobrino 22'50; Keiber Quevedo 33'21; Naal 35'45; Ros 35'57

FFA Technical Center Academy, Yerevan
Referee: Aliaksandr Auramau (Belarus), Dyon Koene (The Netherlands)
29 August 2026
16:00

Unisport Futsal Club (Armenia)	5–2	(Germany) Weilimdorf
Akmataliev 14'25; Melikyan 15'58, 35'13; Vasilev 16'23, 17'16	Report	Redzepi 27'58; Özden 30'13

FFA Technical Center Academy, Yerevan
Referee: Besart Ismajli (Kosovo), Panagiotis Ntalas (Greece)

=== Group F ===
Pos	Team	Pld	W	D	L	GF	GA	GD	Pts	Qualification
1	(Greece) Doukas SAC (H)	3	3	0	0	12	3	+9	9	Advance to main round
2	(England) London Genesis Futsal	3	2	0	1	16	13	+3	6	
3	(Republic of Ireland) Blue Magic Dublin	3	1	0	2	11	14	−3	3	
4	(Northern Ireland) Sparta Belfast	3	0	0	3	7	16	−9	0	

Source: UEFA
Rules for classification: Tiebreakers
(H) Hosts
26 August 2026
15:00

Blue Magic Dublin (Republic of Ireland)	4–7	(England) London Genesis Futsal
Byrne 2'53, 33'52; Pereira Da Silva 13'37; Beraldo 31'25	Report	Byrne 6'30, 25'23, 39'57; Dickson 11'49; Amorim 19'58; Cadete-Borges 25'14; Antelo Martinez 37'52

DAIS Sports Hall, Athens
Referee: Ingus Puriņš (Latvia), Albano Stolaj (Albania)
26 August 2026
18:00

Sparta Belfast (Northern Ireland)	0–3	(Greece) Doukas SAC
	Report	Papadopoulos 4'02; K. Panou 8'23; Bertuola 33'19

DAIS Sports Hall, Athens
Referee: Andrii Kuzmin (Ukraine), Tiran Yeritsyan (Armenia)

27 August 2026
15:00

Sparta Belfast (Northern Ireland)	4–5	(Republic of Ireland) Blue Magic Dublin
Lowry 4'51; Bolbot 20'48, 31'19; R. McMenemy 28'12	Report	Byrne 3'37, 17'02; Saldanha 24'52; Calderon 25'36, 25'58

DAIS Sports Hall, Athens
Referee: Tiran Yeritsyan (Armenia), Ingus Puriņš (Latvia)
27 August 2026
18:00

Doukas SAC (Greece)	6–1	(England) London Genesis Futsal
Araujo Barreira De Souza 7'14, 27'35; Melo Dos Santos Mitidiere 12'29; Bertuola 21'58; Charalampopoulos 29'03; Ensi 33'33	Report	Dickson 27'11

DAIS Sports Hall, Athens
Referee: Albano Stolaj (Albania), Andrii Kuzmin (Ukraine)

29 August 2026
15:00

London Genesis Futsal (England)	8–3	(Northern Ireland) Sparta Belfast
Leal Duppre 9'08, 16'56, 29'25, 39'54; Ribeiro 12'52; Tijerin 21'18; Starrs 25'04; Dickson 31'28	Report	R. McMenemy 5'25, 18'17; Bolbot 38'50

DAIS Sports Hall, Athens
Referee: Tiran Yeritsyan (Armenia), Albano Stolaj (Albania)
29 August 2026
18:00

Doukas SAC (Greece)	3–2	(Republic of Ireland) Blue Magic Dublin
Ensi 26'07; Martins 27'51; Bertuola 28'35	Report	Mattheus Leonardes 28'54; Lucas 33'29 (pen.)

DAIS Sports Hall, Athens
Referee: Andrii Kuzmin (Ukraine), Ingus Puriņš (Latvia)

=== Group G ===
Pos	Team	Pld	W	D	L	GF	GA	GD	Pts	Qualification
1	(Czech Republic) FK Chrudim	3	3	0	0	16	4	+12	9	Advance to main round
2	(Montenegro) Studentski Dom (H)	3	2	0	1	11	9	+2	6	
3	(Scotland) PYF Saltires	3	1	0	2	9	17	−8	3	
4	(Sweden) Futsal Club Kalmar	3	0	0	3	7	13	−6	0	

Source: UEFA
Rules for classification: Tiebreakers
(H) Hosts
26 August 2026
16:30

FK Chrudim (Czech Republic)	8–1	(Scotland) PYF Saltires
Koudelka 5'56; Mykhailo Grytsyna 8'13, 35'59; Stránský 21'04; Tkachuk 22'42; Tichý 26'37; Kuchta 33'43, 35'42	Report	Ritchie 11'03

Verde Complex, Podgorica
Referee: Nikola Rabrenović (Serbia), Richard Toom (Estonia)
26 August 2026
20:30

Futsal Club Kalmar (Sweden)	2–4	(Montenegro) Studentski Dom
Mahmuti 32'47; Rodriguez 35'20	Report	Mijanović 3'57; Puletić 6'57, 39'02; Vidaković 37'11

Verde Complex, Podgorica
Referee: Yauheni Zhalabkou (Belarus), Janne Määttänen (Finland)

27 August 2026
16:30

Futsal Club Kalmar (Sweden)	1–4	(Czech Republic) FK Chrudim
Ramadonovic 16'47	Report	Balog 30'36, 31'58; Mykhailo Grytsyna 31'23; Tkachuk 39'59

Verde Complex, Podgorica
Referee: Janne Määttänen (Finland), Nikola Rabrenović (Serbia)
27 August 2026
20:30

Studentski Dom (Montenegro)	5–3	(Scotland) PYF Saltires
Vlaović 3'01, 18'44; Jovanović 8'23; Marković 18'57; Rakić 38'39	Report	Smith 1'21; Ritchie 9'26; Cullerton 39'28

Verde Complex, Podgorica
Referee: Richard Toom (Estonia), Yauheni Zhalabkou (Belarus)

29 August 2026
16:30

PYF Saltires (Scotland)	5–4	(Sweden) Futsal Club Kalmar
Ritchie 4'01, 6'47 (pen.), 24'52; Nash 38'27; Cullerton 39'52	Report	Mahmuti 15'37, 28'04 (pen.), 33'04; Rodriguez 17'01

Verde Complex, Podgorica
Referee: Yauheni Zhalabkou (Belarus), Richard Toom (Estonia)
29 August 2026
20:30

Studentski Dom (Montenegro)	2–4	(Czech Republic) FK Chrudim
Il. Mugoša 6'27; Vidaković 32'51	Report	Kuchta 16'51; Korolyshyn 23'00; D. Drozd 25'22, 26'36

Verde Complex, Podgorica
Referee: Janne Määttänen (Finland), Nikola Rabrenović (Serbia)

=== Group H ===
Pos	Team	Pld	W	D	L	GF	GA	GD	Pts	Qualification
1	(Finland) Futsal Mad Max	3	3	0	0	16	1	+15	9	Advance to main round
2	(Moldova) Clic Chișinău	3	1	1	1	7	5	+2	4	
3	(Bulgaria) Amigo Northwest (H)	3	1	1	1	8	11	−3	4	
4	(Andorra) Rànger's	3	0	0	3	2	16	−14	0	

Source: UEFA
Rules for classification: Tiebreakers
(H) Hosts
26 August 2026
15:30

Futsal Mad Max (Finland)	8–0	(Andorra) Rànger's
Kaikkola 5'22, 17'58; Korsunov 8'04; Niemelä 9'49; Hosio 14'01, 19'24; Marcos Felipe 32'28; Kuisma 35'13	Report

Arena Burgas, Burgas
Referee: Ademir Avdic (Sweden), Florian Schreiber (Germany)
26 August 2026
18:30

Clic Chișinău (Moldova)	3–3	(Bulgaria) Amigo Northwest
Coval 10'27, 20'52; Vasilevschi 19'36	Report	Botnaru 21'39 (o.g.); Minchev 24'47, 34'53

Arena Burgas, Burgas
Referee: Grigol Bliadze (Georgia), Idan Berenshtein (Israel)

27 August 2026
15:30

Clic Chișinău (Moldova)	0–1	(Finland) Futsal Mad Max
	Report	Do Nascimento Ribeiro Tadeu 34'06

Arena Burgas, Burgas
Referee: Idan Berenshtein (Israel), Ademir Avdic (Sweden)
27 August 2026
18:30

Amigo Northwest (Bulgaria)	4–1	(Andorra) Rànger's
Dobrichov 5'29, 37'17; Kuzmanov 9'39; M. Stoykov 32'38	Report	Ferré 22'14

Arena Burgas, Burgas
Referee: Florian Schreiber (Germany), Grigol Bliadze (Georgia)

29 August 2026
15:30

Rànger's (Andorra)	1–4	(Moldova) Clic Chișinău
Roger Nazzaro 9'26	Report	Botnaru 22'28; Crasnov 27'16, 28'12; Vasilevschi 32'09

Arena Burgas, Burgas
Referee: Florian Schreiber (Germany), Grigol Bliadze (Georgia)
29 August 2026
18:30

Amigo Northwest (Bulgaria)	1–7	(Finland) Futsal Mad Max
Dobrichov 8'03	Report	Do Nascimento Ribeiro Tadeu 0'38; Korsunov 8'48; Kuisma 19'44, 23'42; Niemelä 38'50; Hosio 39'07; Kaikkola 39'45

Arena Burgas, Burgas
Referee: Ademir Avdic (Sweden), Idan Berenshtein (Israel)

== Main round ==
The draw for the preliminary round was held on 8 July 2026, 14:00 CET. The main round will be played from 27 October to 1 November 2026.

Times are CEST, as listed by UEFA (local times, if different, are in parentheses).

=== Seeding ===
A total of 32 teams played in the main round. They were divided in two paths:

- Path A (16 teams): The title holders and teams ranked 1–11 and 16–19. The top three teams in each group proceed to the elite round.
- Path B (16 teams): Teams ranked 12–15 and 20–23 and 8 teams advancing from the preliminary round. The winners of each group move on to the elite round.

Seeding of teams was based on their 2026 UEFA futsal club coefficients. On Path B, the teams ranked 12th to 15th were in seeding position 1 and those ranked 20th to 23rd in position 2. The remaining preliminary round winners were in a further pot to fill positions 3 and 4.

Eight teams (four in each path) were pre-selected as hosts and were first drawn from a separate pot to their corresponding seeding position. The remaining teams were then drawn from their respective pots to their corresponding seeding position. Teams from Armenia & Azerbaijan could not be drawn into the same group.

=== Path A ===
==== Group 1 ====
Pos	Team	Pld	W	D	L	GF	GA	GD	Pts	Qualification
1	(Spain) Barça	3	3	0	0	23	2	+21	9	Advance to elite round
2	(Kazakhstan) Futsal Club Semey	3	2	0	1	12	7	+5	6	Advance to elite round
3	(Switzerland) Futsal Minerva	3	1	0	2	6	14	−8	3	Advance to elite round
4	(Slovakia) MIMEL Lučenec (H)	3	0	0	3	3	21	−18	0	

Source: UEFA
Rules for classification: Tiebreakers
(H) Hosts
28 October 2026
16:00

Barça (Spain)	6–1	(Switzerland) Futsal Minerva
Pito 2'27, 34'35; Neguinho 11'50; Sergio González 12'41; Higor de Souza 15'30, 30'46	Report	Ryan Gomes 11'17

Športová hala Arena, Lučenec
Referee: Ondřej Černý (Czech Republic), Jiri Bergs (Belgium)
28 October 2026
19:00

Futsal Club Semey (Kazakhstan)	6–0	(Slovakia) MIMEL Lučenec
Turegazin 6'17; Pedrinho 17'39; Rodriguinho 28'27; Piyaly 31'30; Dedezinho 35'43; Yesenamanov 36'43	Report

Športová hala Arena, Lučenec
Referee: Daniel Stauber (Austria), Antonio Dimundo (Italy)

29 October 2026
16:00

Futsal Club Semey (Kazakhstan)	1–6	(Spain) Barça
Dedezinho 24'02	Report	Eric 6'04, 33'10; Higor de Souza 17'39; Adolfo 26'13; Mouhoudine 27'09; Antonio Pérez 39'05

Športová hala Arena, Lučenec
Referee: Antonio Dimundo (Italy), Ondřej Černý (Czech Republic)
29 October 2026
19:00

MIMEL Lučenec (Slovakia)	3–4	(Switzerland) Futsal Minerva
Doša 22'43; Lourran 24'58; Leovski 36'33	Report	Ryan Gomes 3'32, 14'41; Leo Costamanha 30'41; Petrov 33'32

Športová hala Arena, Lučenec
Referee: Jiri Bergs (Belgium), Daniel Stauber (Austria)

31 October 2026
15:00

Futsal Minerva (Switzerland)	1–5	(Kazakhstan) Futsal Club Semey
Leo Costamanha 14'11	Report	Dedezinho 14'28 (pen.); Orazov 18'58; Gabriel Candido 21'01, 31'33; Piyaly 39'28

Športová hala Arena, Lučenec
Referee: Ondřej Černý (Czech Republic), Daniel Stauber (Austria)
31 October 2026
18:00

MIMEL Lučenec (Slovakia)	0–11	(Spain) Barça
	Report	Antonio Pérez 5'32; Catela 6'53; Eric 13'08; Adolfo 17'47, 38'49; Roger Garcia 19'18, 36'17; Mouhoudine 24'22; Sergio González 27'24; Mičuda 28'16 (o.g.); Higor de Souza 33'49

Športová hala Arena, Lučenec
Referee: Antonio Dimundo (Italy), Jiri Bergs (Belgium)

==== Group 2 ====
Pos	Team	Pld	W	D	L	GF	GA	GD	Pts	Qualification
1	(Belgium) Anderlecht (H)	3	3	0	0	19	3	+16	9	Advance to elite round
2	(Kazakhstan) Kairat	3	2	0	1	13	11	+2	6	Advance to elite round
3	(Latvia) TFK Beitar	3	1	0	2	8	11	−3	3	Advance to elite round
4	(Romania) United Galați	3	0	0	3	0	15	−15	0	Withdrew

Source: UEFA
Rules for classification: Tiebreakers
(H) Hosts
28 October 2026
20:30

United Galați (Romania)	0–5 Awarded (Note: Match abandoned, Anderlecht won by forfeit. As per a ruling by the UEFA Control, Ethics and Disciplinary Body (CEDB), in accordance with Article 27 of the Regulations of the UEFA Futsal Champions League (refusal to play) in conjunction with Article 27(1) and 27(4) of the UEFA Disciplinary Regulations, the CEBD decided: "To declare all three above 2026/2027 UEFA Futsal Champions League matches forfeited by United Galati, who is therefore deemed to have lost the match 5–0 in accordance with Article 27(1) and 27(4) of the UEFA Disciplinary Regulations.")	(Belgium) Anderlecht
	Report

28 October 2026
20:30

Kairat (Kazakhstan)	5–3	(Latvia) TFK Beitar
Valiullin 3'12; Caio Ruiz 6'56, 19'53, 33'30; Imanbekov 20'47	Report	Kuzmin 21'27, 25'44; Troickis 22'02

Belleheide, Roosdaal
Attendance: 191
Referee: Juan José Cordero Gallardo (Spain), Vasilios Christodoulis (Greece)

29 October 2026
20:30

United Galați (Romania)	0–5 Awarded (Note: Match abandoned, Kairat Almaty won by forfeit. As per a ruling by the UEFA Control, Ethics and Disciplinary Body (CEDB), in accordance with Article 27 of the Regulations of the UEFA Futsal Champions League (refusal to play) in conjunction with Article 27(1) and 27(4) of the UEFA Disciplinary Regulations, the CEBD decided: "To declare all three above 2026/2027 UEFA Futsal Champions League matches forfeited by United Galati, who is therefore deemed to have lost the match 5–0 in accordance with Article 27(1) and 27(4) of the UEFA Disciplinary Regulations.")	(Kazakhstan) Kairat
	Report

29 October 2026
20:30

Anderlecht (Belgium)	6–0	(Latvia) TFK Beitar
Edu 3'59; Lucas Pedala 10'12; Gréllo 10'29; Jean Carmo 16'11; Raúl Jiménez 23'53; Dillien 31'13	Report

Belleheide, Roosdaal
Attendance: 700
Referee: Trayan Enchev (Bulgaria), Martin Matula (Slovakia)

31 October 2026
20:30

TFK Beitar (Latvia)	5–0 Awarded (Note: Match abandoned, Beitar won by forfeit. As per a ruling by the UEFA Control, Ethics and Disciplinary Body (CEDB), in accordance with Article 27 of the Regulations of the UEFA Futsal Champions League (refusal to play) in conjunction with Article 27(1) and 27(4) of the UEFA Disciplinary Regulations, the CEBD decided: "To declare all three above 2026/2027 UEFA Futsal Champions League matches forfeited by United Galati, who is therefore deemed to have lost the match 5–0 in accordance with Article 27(1) and 27(4) of the UEFA Disciplinary Regulations.")	(Romania) United Galați
	Report

31 October 2026
20:30

Anderlecht (Belgium)	8–3	(Kazakhstan) Kairat
Tarakanovs 6'23, 28'24; Gréllo 8'15; Imanbekov 13'03 (o.g.); Rakić 19'58; Lucas Pedala 24'31; Dillien 30'12, 34'30	Report	Gereykhanov 29'13; Caio Ruiz 31'07; Camilo 33'24

Belleheide, Roosdaal
Referee: Martin Matula (Slovakia), Juan José Cordero Gallardo (Spain)

==== Group 3 ====
Pos	Team	Pld	W	D	L	GF	GA	GD	Pts	Qualification
1	(Portugal) Sporting CP	3	3	0	0	19	3	+16	9	Advance to elite round
2	(Belarus) Stalitsa Minsk	3	1	1	1	8	10	−2	4	Advance to elite round
3	(Croatia) MNK Olmissum (H)	3	0	2	1	6	14	−8	2	Advance to elite round
4	(France) Étoile Lavalloise	2	0	1	1	3	9	−6	1	

Source: UEFA
Rules for classification: Tiebreakers
(H) Hosts
28 October 2026
17:00

Sporting CP (Portugal)	5–1	(Belarus) Stalitsa Minsk
Rúben Teixeira 14'00, 36'57; Tomás Paçó 28'16; Rufino 30'43; Vinicius Rocha 31'43	Report	Shcherbich 23'28

Sportska dvorana Ribnjak, Omiš
Referee: Vlad Nicolae Ciobanu (Romania), Giovanni Zannola (Italy)
28 October 2026
20:00

Étoile Lavalloise (France)	1–1	(Croatia) MNK Olmissum
El Mesrar 1'06	Report	Da Costa 29'52

Sportska dvorana Ribnjak, Omiš
Referee: Juan Boelen (Belgium), Kamil Szczołko (Poland)

29 October 2026
17:00

Étoile Lavalloise (France)	1–5	(Portugal) Sporting CP
Aberkan 24'43	Report	Tomás Paçó 1'11; Rúben Teixeira 7'31, 28'21; Merlim 11'34, 12'54

Sportska dvorana Ribnjak, Omiš
Referee: Kamil Szczołko (Poland), Vlad Nicolae Ciobanu (Romania)
29 October 2026
20:00

MNK Olmissum (Croatia)	4–4	(Belarus) Stalitsa Minsk
Đurić 4'55; Barbarić 14'58; Da Costa 39'21; Vanha 39'40	Report	Somplei 25'38, 33'17, 38'20; Zabolonkov 35'03

Sportska dvorana Ribnjak, Omiš
Referee: Giovanni Zannola (Italy), Juan Boelen (Belgium)

31 October 2026
17:00

Stalitsa Minsk (Belarus)	3–1	(France) Étoile Lavalloise
Yakubov 5'57; Luksha 39'15; Zabolonkov 39'40	Report	El Mesrar 27'02

Sportska dvorana Ribnjak, Omiš
Referee: Kamil Szczołko (Poland), Giovanni Zannola (Italy)
31 October 2026
20:15

MNK Olmissum (Croatia)	1–9	(Portugal) Sporting CP
Kovačević 19'05	Report	Rúben Teixeira 8'14; Tomás Paçó 10'36; Bruno Pinto 11'53, 35'47; Wesley França 12'21; Vinicius Rocha 20'17; Felipe Valério 30'40; Bruno Maior 34'22; Chishkala 36'00

Sportska dvorana Ribnjak, Omiš
Referee: Juan Boelen (Belgium), Vlad Nicolae Ciobanu (Romania)

==== Group 4 ====
Pos	Team	Pld	W	D	L	GF	GA	GD	Pts	Qualification
1	(Portugal) SL Benfica	3	2	1	0	14	7	+7	7	Advance to elite round
2	(Ukraine) HIT Kyiv	3	2	1	0	11	7	+4	7	Advance to elite round
3	(Spain) ElPozo Murcia	3	1	0	2	5	6	−1	3	Advance to elite round
4	(Netherlands) Tigers Roermond (H)	3	0	0	3	5	15	−10	0	

Source: UEFA
Rules for classification: Tiebreakers
(H) Hosts
28 October 2026
17:00

SL Benfica (Portugal)	4–4	(Ukraine) HIT Kyiv
Raúl Moreira 17'00; Silvestre Ferreira 32'29; Lúcio Jr 33'51; Carlos Monteiro 37'12	Report	André Coelho 9'01 (o.g.); Sander De Freitas 13'03, 22'34; Pediash 18'07

Jo Gerrishal, Roermond
Referee: Kaloyan Kirilov (Bulgaria), Bryan Claude François (France)
28 October 2026
20:30

ElPozo Murcia (Spain)	3–1	(Netherlands) Tigers Roermond
Dener Rodrigo 0'59; Santa Cruz 8'01; Alvarez 23'01	Report	Charraoui 27'21

Jo Gerrishal, Roermond
Referee: Arttu Kyynaeraeinen (Finland), Norbert Szilágyi (Hungary)

29 October 2026
17:00

ElPozo Murcia (Spain)	2–3	(Portugal) SL Benfica
Ricardinho 1'49; Marcel 3'47	Report	André Coelho 9'52, 24'09; Cleber 16'07

Jo Gerrishal, Roermond
Referee: Bryan Claude François (France), Arttu Kyynaeraeinen (Finland)
29 October 2026
20:30

Tigers Roermond (Netherlands)	3–5	(Ukraine) HIT Kyiv
El Allouchi 10'41; Borite 18'22; Mellah 28'58	Report	Pervieiev 2'19, 8'55; Pediash 24'47; Podliuk 27'44; Malynovskyi 32'20

Jo Gerrishal, Roermond
Referee: Norbert Szilágyi (Hungary), Kaloyan Kirilov (Bulgaria)

31 October 2026
17:00

HIT Kyiv (Ukraine)	2–0	(Spain) ElPozo Murcia
Podliuk 3'37; Pervieiev 16'48 (pen.)	Report

Jo Gerrishal, Roermond
Referee: Bryan Claude François (France), Norbert Szilágyi (Hungary)
31 October 2026
20:30

Tigers Roermond (Netherlands)	1–7	(Portugal) SL Benfica
El-Ayyane 27'53	Report	Lúcio Jr 1'37; Kutchy 2'46; Carlos Monteiro 2'55, 10'14; André Coelho 6'24; Silvestre Ferreira 24'50; Arthur 35'05

Jo Gerrishal, Roermond
Referee: Arttu Kyynaeraeinen (Finland), Kaloyan Kirilov (Bulgaria)

=== Path B ===
==== Group 5 ====
Pos	Team	Pld	W	D	L	GF	GA	GD	Pts	Qualification
1	(Poland) Piast Gliwice (H)	3	2	1	0	11	4	+7	7	Advance to elite round
2	(Bosnia and Herzegovina) Buba Mara	3	2	0	1	15	10	+5	6	
3	(Azerbaijan) Araz Naxçivan	3	1	0	2	8	14	−6	3	
4	(Hungary) Újpest	3	0	1	2	9	15	−6	1	

Source: UEFA
Rules for classification: Tiebreakers
(H) Hosts
27 October 2026
13:00

Araz Naxçivan (Azerbaijan)	5–4	(Hungary) Újpest
Rustamli 4'38, 17'41, 27'13; Alakbarov 10'25; Manafov 20'49	Report	Suscsák 1'01; Cardoso Alves 6'02; Guluzade 21'33 (o.g.); Alakbarov 38'43 (o.g.)

Gliwice Arena, Gliwice
Referee: Victor Chaix (France), Sergejs Šacmans (Latvia)
27 October 2026
19:00

Buba Mara (Bosnia and Herzegovina)	2–4	(Poland) Piast Gliwice
Gosto 19'53; Pedro Silva 37'02	Report	Spellanzon 9'58; Juan Emilio 14'04; Bruno Graça 14'50; Kriezel 22'24

Gliwice Arena, Gliwice
Referee: Daniele D'adamo (San Marino), Igors Jacevičs (Latvia)

28 October 2026
14:30

Buba Mara (Bosnia and Herzegovina)	5–3	(Azerbaijan) Araz Naxçivan
Perić 0'14; Kadić 26'02; Gosto 29'28; Bundavica 30'34; Ibrisimović 37'30	Report	Rustamli 7'21; Guluzade 25'23; Manafov 38'26

Gliwice Arena, Gliwice
Referee: Igors Jacevičs (Latvia), Victor Chaix (France)
28 October 2026
19:00

Piast Gliwice (Poland)	2–2	(Hungary) Újpest
Cardoso Alves 9'30 (o.g.); Spellanzon 27'02	Report	Suscsák 35'46; Szalmás 36'49

Gliwice Arena, Gliwice
Referee: Sergejs Šacmans (Latvia), Daniele D'adamo (San Marino)

30 October 2026
13:00

Újpest (Hungary)	3–8	(Bosnia and Herzegovina) Buba Mara
Czerman 19'47; Suscsák 22'03, 25'17	Report	Gosto 5'00; Perić 25'26, 26'25, 34'36; Ibrisimović 28'14; Bundavica 29'29; Diego Favero 32'41; Prošić 37'20

Gliwice Arena, Gliwice
Referee: Igors Jacevičs (Latvia), Daniele D'adamo (San Marino)
30 October 2026
19:00

Piast Gliwice (Poland)	5–0	(Azerbaijan) Araz Naxçivan
Rafa Félix 3'57; Spellanzon 6'49; Korpela 7'13, 35'09; Dill 17'17	Report

Gliwice Arena, Gliwice
Referee: Victor Chaix (France), Sergejs Šacmans (Latvia)

==== Group 6 ====
Pos	Team	Pld	W	D	L	GF	GA	GD	Pts	Qualification
1	(Lithuania) Kauno Žalgiris	3	2	1	0	13	8	+5	7	Advance to elite round
2	(Armenia) Unisport Futsal Club	3	2	0	1	11	7	+4	6	
3	(Luxembourg) Differdange 03 (H)	2	1	0	1	11	14	−3	3	
4	(Greece) Doukas SAC	3	0	1	2	8	14	−6	1	

Source: UEFA
Rules for classification: Tiebreakers
(H) Hosts
27 October 2026
16:00

Kauno Žalgiris (Lithuania)	2–0	(Armenia) Unisport Futsal Club
Vinicius Carvalho 4'10, 10'07	Report

Centre Sportif John Scheuren, Oberkorn
Referee: Julien Lang (France), Filipe Duarte (Portugal)
27 October 2026
19:00

Doukas SAC (Greece)	2–4	(Luxembourg) Differdange 03
Zompolas 32'04; Araujo Barreira De Souza 32'49	Report	Rúben Reis 1'27, 17'07 (pen.); Teka 37'29; Bocum 39'55

Centre Sportif John Scheuren, Oberkorn
Referee: Joern Te Kloeze (Netherlands), Vladimir Sebek (Montenegro)

28 October 2026
16:00

Doukas SAC (Greece)	4–4	(Lithuania) Kauno Žalgiris
Papadopoulos 16'54; Bertuola 19'55 (pen.); Melo Dos Santos Mitidiere 28'26; Vinicious 35'15	Report	Vinicius Carvalho 24'17; Silva Rivera 27'25; Da Costa 36'55, 38'17

Centre Sportif John Scheuren, Oberkorn
Referee: Vladimir Sebek (Montenegro), Julien Lang (France)
28 October 2026
19:00

Differdange 03 (Luxembourg)	3–5	(Armenia) Unisport Futsal Club
Beto 2'02; Unjanque 12'20; Oliveira Garrido 39'23	Report	Vasilev 4'03; Melkonyan 21'26; Marquinhos 26'29; Mashumyan 29'50; Dermenjyan 38'57

Centre Sportif John Scheuren, Oberkorn
Referee: Filipe Duarte (Portugal), Joern Te Kloeze (Netherlands)

30 October 2026
17:00

Unisport Futsal Club (Armenia)	6–2	(Greece) Doukas SAC
Dermenjyan 1'10; Elisandro 3'33, 13'14; Mashumyan 17'22; Vasilev 26'46, 32'49	Report	Gerolymos 26'29; Vinicious 30'22

Centre Sportif John Scheuren, Oberkorn
Referee: Joern Te Kloeze (Netherlands), Vladimir Sebek (Montenegro)
30 October 2026
20:00

Differdange 03 (Luxembourg)	4–7	(Lithuania) Kauno Žalgiris
Oliveira Garrido 2'33; Rúben Reis 27'51; Beto 34'18; Porfírio Leitão 36'56	Report	Anderson Tangará 15'31 (pen.), 28'34; Silva Rivera 16'21, 25'18; Da Costa 18'59, 22'47; Stalmokas 39'03

Centre Sportif John Scheuren, Oberkorn
Referee: Julien Lang (France), Filipe Duarte (Portugal)

==== Group 7 ====
Pos	Team	Pld	W	D	L	GF	GA	GD	Pts	Qualification
1	(Italy) L84 Torino (H)	3	3	0	0	19	1	+18	9	Advance to elite round
2	(Malta) Luxol St Andrews	3	2	0	1	10	9	+1	6	
3	(Finland) Futsal Mad Max	3	1	0	2	11	12	−1	3	
4	(Denmark) Hjørring	2	0	0	2	4	22	−18	0	

Source: UEFA
Rules for classification: Tiebreakers
(H) Hosts
28 October 2026
16:30

Luxol St Andrews (Malta)	4–2	(Denmark) Hjørring
Jefferson Alves 3'24; Luiz Murad 21'02, 34'32; Castelo Branco Carvalho De Sa' 26'34	Report	Rams 6'20; Kasumovic 39'52

PalaMaggiore Leinì, Leini
Referee: Denys Kutsyi (Ukraine), David Glavonjic (Sweden)
28 October 2026
20:30

Futsal Mad Max (Finland)	0–5	(Italy) L84 Torino
	Report	Terry 2'20; Fortini 12'10; Rescia 15'42, 32'34; Garcia Gonzalez 34'52

PalaMaggiore Leinì, Leini
Referee: Rastislav Behancin (Slovakia), Maximilian Lüders (Germany)

29 October 2026
16:30

Futsal Mad Max (Finland)	3–5	(Malta) Luxol St Andrews
Korsunov 9'30; Do Nascimento Ribeiro Tadeu 29'33; Niemelä 33'10	Report	Luiz Murad 15'02; C. Alves 24'20, 39'24; Leanderson 36'25; Vevé 38'50

PalaMaggiore Leinì, Leini
Referee: Maximilian Lüders (Germany), Denys Kutsyi (Ukraine)
29 October 2026
20:30

L84 Torino (Italy)	10–0	(Denmark) Hjørring
Fortini 2'22; Hamadi Hamed 3'50; Schiochet 12'12; Rescia 18'17; Dias 20'52; Lopes 24'47, 35'40; ilvan Ferreira 26'25; De Oliveira 30'30; Salas 36'33 (pen.)	Report

PalaMaggiore Leinì, Leini
Referee: David Glavonjic (Sweden), Rastislav Behancin (Slovakia)

31 October 2026
16:30

Hjørring (Denmark)	2–8	(Finland) Futsal Mad Max
Kaisto 24'02 (o.g.); Gantzhorn 35'10	Report	Kaisto 0'14; Niemelä 2'20; Marcos Felipe 3'54; Korsunov 7'40, 21'20; Do Nascimento Ribeiro Tadeu 17'44, 36'20; Kaikkola 34'28

PalaMaggiore Leinì, Leini
Referee: Rastislav Behancin (Slovakia), Maximilian Lüders (Germany)
31 October 2026
20:30

L84 Torino (Italy)	4–1	(Malta) Luxol St Andrews
Rescia 14'02; De Oliveira 30'17; Siqueira 30'59; Salas 39'32 (pen.)	Report	Maikinho 9'28

PalaMaggiore Leinì, Leini
Referee: Denys Kutsyi (Ukraine), David Glavonjic (Sweden)

==== Group 8 ====
Pos	Team	Pld	W	D	L	GF	GA	GD	Pts	Qualification
1	(Ukraine) Athletic Futsal	3	2	1	0	9	6	+3	7	Advance to elite round
2	(Czech Republic) FK Chrudim	3	1	2	0	10	6	+4	5	
3	(Austria) Athletic Club Graz	3	1	1	1	6	6	0	4	
4	(Serbia) KMF Loznica (H)	3	0	0	3	6	13	−7	0	

Source: UEFA
Rules for classification: Tiebreakers
(H) Hosts
28 October 2026
17:30

Athletic Futsal (Ukraine)	3–3	(Czech Republic) FK Chrudim
Andre 15'09; Vasyliev 24'21; Mykhailo Grytsyna 35'57 (o.g.)	Report	D. Drozd 11'03, 34'53; Hromek 32'29

Lagator Hall, Loznica
Referee: David Urdánoz Apezteguía (Spain), Maximilian Alkofer (Germany)
28 October 2026
20:30

Athletic Club Graz (Austria)	4–2	(Serbia) KMF Loznica
Čeh 6'58; Bukovec 12'01, 14'28; Fideršek 34'57	Report	Ramić 31'36; Araujo Santiago 37'08

Lagator Hall, Loznica
Referee: Liviu Dumitru Chita (Romania), Alan Patchell (Ireland)

29 October 2026
17:30

Athletic Club Graz (Austria)	1–3	(Ukraine) Athletic Futsal
Bukovec 2'37	Report	Andre 8'36; Nahornyi 35'35; Vasyliev 39'44

Lagator Hall, Loznica
Referee: Alan Patchell (Ireland), David Urdánoz Apezteguía (Spain)
29 October 2026
20:30

KMF Loznica (Serbia)	2–6	(Czech Republic) FK Chrudim
Kadić 4'32; Blagojević 39'18	Report	Mykhailo Grytsyna 5'33, 26'01, 27'23; Korolyshyn 21'38; Balog 30'41, 32'23

Lagator Hall, Loznica
Referee: Maximilian Alkofer (Germany), Liviu Dumitru Chita (Romania)

31 October 2026
17:30

FK Chrudim (Czech Republic)	1–1	(Austria) Athletic Club Graz
D. Drozd 11'54	Report	Bukovec 6'43

Lagator Hall, Loznica
Referee: Maximilian Alkofer (Germany), Alan Patchell (Ireland)
31 October 2026
20:30

KMF Loznica (Serbia)	2–3	(Ukraine) Athletic Futsal
Araujo Santiago 17'12; Ramić 31'29	Report	Levy 4'37, 32'17; Andre 13'39

Lagator Hall, Loznica
Referee: David Urdánoz Apezteguía (Spain), Liviu Dumitru Chita (Romania)

== Knockout stage ==
The knockout round consists of a round of 16 and the quarter-finals. The round of 16 contenders were decided by the main round, with 12 teams emerging from Path A and four from Path B. The two-legged round of 16 and quarter-final stages replace the former elite round under the new format for 2025/26. Ties scheduled for 24 November and 5 December, with the first-named team at home in the opening leg.

The final tournament will be a one-venue four-team knockout event held in Biel/Bienne, Switzerland, with the semi-finals taking place on 7 May and the final and third-place match two days later on 9 May. A separate draw will be held to set the semi-finals.

The draw was held on 4 November 2026 at 14:00 CET.

=== Bracket ===
Round of 16
23 November / 4 December 2026
(Italy) L84 Torino
(Ukraine) HIT Kyiv
24 November / 5 December 2026
(Ukraine) Athletic Futsal
(Kazakhstan) Futsal Club Semey
23 November / 4 December 2026
(Spain) ElPozo Murcia
(Belgium) Anderlecht
23 November / 4 December 2026
(Poland) Piast Gliwice
(Kazakhstan) Kairat
23 November / 4 December 2026
(Switzerland) Futsal Minerva
(Belarus) Stalitsa Minsk
23 November / 4 December 2026
(Croatia) MNK Olmissum
(Spain) Barça
23 November / 5 December 2026
(Latvia) TFK Beitar
(Portugal) Sporting CP
23 November / 4 December 2026
(Lithuania) Kauno Žalgiris
(Portugal) SL Benfica

Quarter-finals
8 / 19 February 2027
8 / 19 February 2027
8 / 19 February 2027
8 / 19 February 2027

Semi-finals
7 May 2027
7 May 2027

Final
9 May 2027
Third place
9 May 2027

=== Matches ===
Times are CET (UTC+1), as listed by UEFA (local times, if different, are in parentheses).

==== Round of 16 ====
23 November 2026
21:00

L84 Torino (Italy)	v	(Ukraine) HIT Kyiv
	Report

PalaMaggiore Leinì, Leini
4 December 2026
18:00

HIT Kyiv (Ukraine)	v	(Italy) L84 Torino
	Report

FMF Futsal Arena, Ciorescu

24 November 2026
18:00

Athletic Futsal (Ukraine)	v	(Kazakhstan) Futsal Club Semey
	Report

FMF Futsal Arena, Ciorescu
5 December 2026
15:00

Futsal Club Semey (Kazakhstan)	v	(Ukraine) Athletic Futsal
	Report

Abai Arena, Semey

23 November 2026
20:30

ElPozo Murcia (Spain)	v	(Belgium) Anderlecht
	Report

Palacio de Deportes de Murcia, Murcia
4 December 2026
20:30

Anderlecht (Belgium)	v	(Spain) ElPozo Murcia
	Report

Belleheide, Roosdaal

23 November 2026
19:00

Piast Gliwice (Poland)	v	(Kazakhstan) Kairat
	Report

Gliwice Arena, Gliwice
4 December 2026
16:00

Kairat (Kazakhstan)	v	(Poland) Piast Gliwice
	Report

Baluan Sholak Sports Palace, Almaty

23 November 2026
18:30

Futsal Minerva (Switzerland)	v	(Belarus) Stalitsa Minsk
	Report

Sporthalle Weissenstein, Bern
4 December 2026
14:30

Stalitsa Minsk (Belarus)	v	(Switzerland) Futsal Minerva
	Report

Sport Hall Humenné, Humenne

23 November 2026
20:00

MNK Olmissum (Croatia)	v	(Spain) Barça
	Report

Sportska dvorana Ribnjak, Omiš
4 December 2026
20:30

Barça (Spain)	v	(Croatia) MNK Olmissum
	Report

Palau Blaugrana, Barcelona

23 November 2026
19:00

TFK Beitar (Latvia)	v	(Portugal) Sporting CP
	Report

Zemgale Olympic Center, Jelgava
5 December 2026
20:00

Sporting CP (Portugal)	v	(Latvia) TFK Beitar
	Report

Pavilhão João Rocha, Lisbon

23 November 2026
19:00

Kauno Žalgiris (Lithuania)	v	(Portugal) SL Benfica
	Report

Darius and Girėnas Stadium, Kaunas
4 December 2026
20:00

SL Benfica (Portugal)	v	(Lithuania) Kauno Žalgiris
	Report

Pavilhão Fidelidade, Lisbon
