= MFC HIT Kyiv =

HIT Kyiv
- Full name: MFC HIT Kyiv
- Founded: 2005
- Ground: CSK ZSU Stadium, Kyiv, Ukraine
- Capacity: 500
- Chairman: (Ukraine) Volodymyr Kotlyar
- Manager: (Ukraine) Serhiy Zhurba
- League: Futsal Championship
- 2025-26: 1
- Website: fchit.kyiv.ua
Home colours	Away colours

MFC HIT Kyiv (ukr. Міні-Футбольний Клуб «ХІТ» Київ), is a futsal club from Kyiv, Ukraine, and plays in Ukrainian Men's Futsal Championship. Founded in 2005, the club has risen from amateur football to become three-time champions of Ukraine.

== History ==
The club was founded in 2005 as a team of employees of the "Eney" company. In its early years, HIT participated in the amateur tournament, winning it on multiple occasions.

In 2014/15 season being the amateur club, HIT reached the Ukrainian Cup final but lost on penalties to Manzana SC (2:2, 3:2 pen.).

In 2015, HIT transitioned to professional futsal, entering the Ukrainian Futsal First League and won it in the first season. Also, the club reached the Ukrainian Cup final again but lost it to Lokomotyv Kharkiv (2:4).

The following 2015/16 season, HIT repeated both achievements — another Cup final appearance (losing 2–5 to Lokomotyv Kharkiv) and a second consecutive First League championship.

HIT entered the Extra League in the 2016/17 season. Despite leading the table after the first half of the season, the newcomers finished 4th. The club finished 4th again in 2017/18 but won the Super Cup. HIT earned bronze medals in 2018/19 and 2020/21, and silver in 2019/20.

On 31 May 2023, HIT won their first-ever Extra League title, defeating Uragan Ivano-Frankivsk in the fifth and deciding game of the playoff final in Ivano-Frankivsk. Yevhenii Zhuk became the league's top scorer with 33 goals. In August 2023, the club claimed their second Super Cup, beating Kardynal-Rivne 2–0.

The 2023/24 season brought a second consecutive championship, with HIT defeating Energia Lviv in 3 games (5–2, 2–2 (4–3 pen.), 5–0) in the playoff final. HIT secured a third straight title in 2024/25, establishing themselves as the dominant force in Ukrainian futsal.

== Honours ==
=== Domestic ===
- Ukrainian Extra-Liga:

(gold) Winners (4): 2022/23, 2023/24, 2024/25, 2025/26
(silver) Runners-up (1): 2019/20
(bronze) Third place (2): 2018/19, 2020/21

- Ukrainian Futsal Super Cup:

(gold) Winners (2): 2017, 2023

- Ukrainian Futsal Cup:

(gold) Winners (1): 2025/26
(silver) Runners-up (6): 2014/15, 2015/16, 2016/17, 2019/20, 2020/21, 2022/23

- Ukrainian First League (second tier):

(gold) Winners (2): 2015/16, 2016/17

=== European ===
- UEFA Futsal Champions League:

Round of 16: 2025/26

=== National team ===
- FIFA Futsal World Cup 2024:

(bronze) Third command place: Ihor Cherniavskyi, Danyil Abakshyn, Yevhenii Zhuk, Andriy Melnyk, Oleksandr Sukhov

(silver) Individual Silver Boot: Danyil Abakshyn

== HIT Kyiv in European football ==
HIT Kyiv made the first appearance in UEFA Futsal Champions League in 2023/24 season, reaching the elite round.

In the 2025–26 UEFA Futsal Champions League, the club advanced to the round of 16, where they were eliminated by current champions Palma Futsal (2–2, 2–4).

As of match played November 2026

Season	Round	Opponent	Score	Result
2023–24	Main round Croatia	(Croatia) Olmissum	4–1	W
2023–24	Main round Croatia	(Portugal) Sporting CP	2–2	D
2023–24	Main round Croatia	(Kazakhstan) Ayat	2–2	D
2023–24	Elite round Palma, Spain	(Poland) KSC Lubawa	5–6	L
2023–24	Elite round Palma, Spain	(Croatia) Olmissum	4–3	W
2023–24	Elite round Palma, Spain	(Spain) Palma Futsal	2–2	D
2024–25	Main round Belgium	(Belgium) Anderlecht	2–8	L
2024–25	Main round Belgium	(Spain) Cartagena	1–4	L
2024–25	Main round Belgium	(Poland) Rekord	2–2	D
2025–26	Main round Ljubljana, Slovenia	(North Macedonia) Futsal Club Forca	10–2	W
2025–26	Main round Ljubljana, Slovenia	(Ukraine) Kyiv Futsal	5–0	W
2025–26	Main round Ljubljana, Slovenia	(Slovenia) NK Vrhnika	2–1	W
2025–26	Round of 16	(Spain) Palma Futsal (Leg 1, Hungary)	2–2	D
2025–26	Round of 16	(Spain) Palma Futsal (Leg 2, (Spain) Mallorca)	2–4	L
2026–27	Main round Roermond, Netherlands	(Portugal) SL Benfica	4–4	D
2026–27	Main round Roermond, Netherlands	(Netherlands) Tigers Roermond	5–3	W
2026–27	Main round Roermond, Netherlands	(Spain) ElPozo Murcia	2–0	W
2026–27	Round of 16			

=== Summary ===
Season	Pld	W	D	L	GF	GA	Last round
2023–24	6	2	3	1	19	17	Elite round
2024–25	3	0	1	2	5	14	Main round
2025–26	5	3	1	1	21	9	Round of 16
2026–27							
Total	14	5	5	4	45	40	
