= Latvian Futsal Premier League =

Optibet Telpu futbola Virslīga
- Founded: 1997
- Country: Latvia
- Confederation: UEFA
- Number of clubs: 9 (2025–26 season)
- Level on pyramid: 1
- Domestic cup: Latvian Futsal Cup
- International cup: UEFA Futsal Cup
- Current champions: Riga FC (2025–26 season)
- Most championships: FK Nikars (12 titles)
- Website: ltfa.lv
- Current: Current Season at LFF.lv

The Optibet Latvian Futsal Higher League (Latvian: Optibet Telpu futbola virslīga) is the premier futsal championship in Latvia. It is organized since 1997 by the Latvian Indoor Football Association (Latvian: Latvijas Telpu futbola asociācija, LTFA) under the supervision of the Latvian Football Federation. The champion qualifies for the UEFA Futsal Cup. The most successful team in the history of the league has been FK Nikars, winning 12 titles.

Since the 2017-18 season, the league is sponsored by betting firm Optibet.

== Past winners ==
- 1997–98: Spīdvejs Daugavpils
- 1998–99: AVG Rīga
- 1999–2000: Lido Rīga
- 2000–01: FK Policija Rīga
- 2001–02: FK Policija Rīga
- 2002–03: Viesnīca OMA Rīga
- 2003–04: Bugroff Rīga
- 2004–05: FK Raba Rīga
- 2005–06: FK Raba Rīga
- 2006–07: FK Kimmel/Kauguri Jūrmala
- 2007–08: FK Nikars
- 2008–09: FK Nikars
- 2009–10: FK Nikars
- 2010–11: FK Nikars
- 2011–12: FK Nikars
- 2012–13: FK Nikars
- 2013–14: FK Nikars
- 2014–15: FK Nikars
- 2015–16: FK Nikars
- 2016–17: FK Nikars
- 2017–18: FK Nikars
- 2018–19: FK Nikars
- 2019–20: FC Petrow
- 2020–21: FK Raba
- 2021–22: FC Petrow/Jelgava
- 2022–23: Riga FC (Note: FC Petrow was taken over by and renamed as Riga Futsal Club in March 2023)
- 2023–24: Riga FC
- 2024–25: Riga FC
- 2025–26: Riga FC
