= Sporting Club de Paris =

- Founded: 2000
- Ground: Gymnase Georges Carpentier, Paris, France
- Capacity: 4,800
- Chairman: (Portugal) José Lopes de Sousa
- Manager: (France) (Portugal) Rodolphe Lopes
- League: Division 1 Futsal
- 2021-22: Division 1, 1st
Home colours	Away colours

Sporting Club de Paris is a French Futsal club, based in Paris in the 13th district, and having the emblem of the Sporting CP as an official affiliate. Sporting is a quadruple Championnat winner in France as well as a four-time winner of the Coupe de France de Futsal.

Sporting Club de Paris is the French club's most successful futsal and continuously represents France in the UEFA Futsal Cup, the most prestigious European competition for futsal.

== Honors ==
- Division 1 Futsal: 5
- 2010-11, 2011-12, 2012-13, 2013-14, 2021-22
- Coupe de France: 6
- 2009-10, 2010-11, 2011-12, 2012-13, 2014-15, 2018-19

== Current squad ==
As of 1 March 2023

#	Position	Name	Nationality
1	Goalkeeper	Ibrahima Souaré	(France)
12	Goalkeeper	Laion De Freitas	(Brazil)
20	Goalkeeper	Alain Douang	(France)
8	Defender	Sid Belhaj	(France)
10	Defender	Alexandre Teixeira	(France)
18	Defender	Samba Kébé	(France)
5	Winger	Jonathan Chaulet	(France)
6	Winger	Éder Luan Schade	(Brazil)
7	Winger	Ayoub Saadaoui	(France)
13	Winger	Mamadou Konaté	(France)
14	Winger	Landry N'Gala	(France)
17	Winger	Steven Ndukuta	(France)
19	Winger	Youba Soumaré	(France)
3	Pivot	Thiago Bolinha	(Azerbaijan)
11	Pivot	Boulaye Ba	(France)
15	Pivot	Fineo de Araujo	(Azerbaijan)

== UEFA Club Competitions record ==
Appearances: 5

Season	Competition	Round	Country	Opponent	Result	Venue (Host City)	Qualified
2011/12	UEFA Futsal Cup	Preliminary Round (Group G)	(Cyprus)	Omonia	4–5	Eleftheria; Indoor Hall (Nicosia)	2nd place
2011/12	UEFA Futsal Cup	Preliminary Round (Group G)	(Armenia)	Erebuni	6–1	Eleftheria; Indoor Hall (Nicosia)	2nd place
2011/12	UEFA Futsal Cup	Preliminary Round (Group G)	(Albania)	KS Flamurtari	9–5	Eleftheria; Indoor Hall (Nicosia)	2nd place
2012/13	UEFA Futsal Cup	Preliminary Round (Group D)	(Germany)	Hamburg Panthers	6–3	Gymnase; G. Carpentier (Paris)	1st place
2012/13	UEFA Futsal Cup	Preliminary Round (Group D)	(Scotland)	Fair City Santos	18–2	Gymnase; G. Carpentier (Paris)	1st place
2012/13	UEFA Futsal Cup	Preliminary Round (Group D)	(Belgium)	Topsport Antwerpen	4–4	Gymnase; G. Carpentier (Paris)	1st place
2012/13	UEFA Futsal Cup	Main Round (Group 4)	(Georgia (country))	Iberia Star	2–3	Sportna; Dvorana (Litija)	3rd place
2012/13	UEFA Futsal Cup	Main Round (Group 4)	(Slovenia)	FC Litija	3–3	Sportna; Dvorana (Litija)	3rd place
2012/13	UEFA Futsal Cup	Main Round (Group 4)	(Greece)	Athina 90	7–1	Sportna; Dvorana (Litija)	3rd place
2013/14	UEFA Futsal Cup	Preliminary Round (Group A)	(Moldova)	Lexmax Chişinău	8–0	Kaunas; Sports Hall (Kaunas)	1st place
2013/14	UEFA Futsal Cup	Preliminary Round (Group A)	(Lithuania)	Nautara Kaunas	17–0	Kaunas; Sports Hall (Kaunas)	1st place
2013/14	UEFA Futsal Cup	Main Round (Group 3)	(Italy)	Marca Futsal	0–4	Lokomotyv; Sports Palace (Kharkiv)	4th place
2013/14	UEFA Futsal Cup	Main Round (Group 3)	(Ukraine)	Lokomotyv Kharkiv	6–4	Lokomotyv; Sports Palace (Kharkiv)	4th place
2013/14	UEFA Futsal Cup	Main Round (Group 3)	(Kazakhstan)	MFC Tulpar	1–6	Lokomotyv; Sports Palace (Kharkiv)	4th place
2014/15	UEFA Futsal Cup	Main Round (Group 1)	(North Macedonia)	Železarec Skopje	6–3	Sportovní Hala (Chrudim)	1st place
2014/15	UEFA Futsal Cup	Main Round (Group 1)	(Belarus)	Stalitsa Minsk	10–7	Sportovní Hala (Chrudim)	1st place
2014/15	UEFA Futsal Cup	Main Round (Group 1)	(Czech Republic)	Era-Pack Chrudim	6–4	Sportovní Hala (Chrudim)	1st place
2014/15	UEFA Futsal Cup	Elite Round (Group C)	(Serbia)	KMF Ekonomac	4–1	Baluan Sholak; Sports Palace (Almaty)	2nd place
2014/15	UEFA Futsal Cup	Elite Round (Group C)	(Kazakhstan)	AFC Kairat	7–11	Baluan Sholak; Sports Palace (Almaty)	2nd place
2014/15	UEFA Futsal Cup	Elite Round (Group C)	(Latvia)	FK Nikars	5–4	Baluan Sholak; Sports Palace (Almaty)	2nd place
2022/23	UEFA Futsal; Champions League	Main Round (Group 1)	(Spain)	Palma Futsal	5–11	Belleheide; Sport Center (Roosdaal)	4th place
2022/23	UEFA Futsal; Champions League	Main Round (Group 1)	(Belgium)	Anderlecht	0–4	Belleheide; Sport Center (Roosdaal)	4th place
2022/23	UEFA Futsal; Champions League	Main Round (Group 1)	(Kazakhstan)	AFC Kairat	2–3	Belleheide; Sport Center (Roosdaal)	4th place
