= Paris Métropole Futsal =

Paris Métropole
- Full name: Paris Métropole Futsal Club
- Founded: 2001
- Ground: Centre Sportif Didot, Paris, France
- Capacity: 500
- League: Championnat de France de Futsal
Home colours	Away colours

Paris Métropole Futsal Club is a futsal club based in Paris, France. The club was founded in 2001, played in the Championnat de France de Futsal.

== Honours ==
- 2009 Champion de France
- 2007 Coupe Nationale de Futsal
