= UEFA Futsal Champions League =

Futsal tournament

- Organiser(s): UEFA
- Founded: 2001; 25 years ago (rebranded in 2018)
- Region: Europe
- Current champions: (Portugal) Sporting CP (3rd title)
- Most championships: (Spain) Inter Movistar (5 titles)
- Broadcasters: List of broadcasters
- Website: uefa.com/uefafutsalchampionsleague
- 2026–27 UFCL

The UEFA Futsal Champions League is an annual futsal competition for European club teams organized by UEFA. It was founded as the UEFA Futsal Cup in 2001 and replaced the Futsal European Clubs Championship, an unofficial competition held since 1984. The final of the first edition was played in a single game in Lisbon, while the following four editions were decided over two legs. Since 2006–07, the winner is decided through a final four tournament.

In 2018, the tournament was rebranded as UEFA Futsal Champions League.

== History ==
1. Futsal European Clubs Championship (1984–2001)
2. UEFA Futsal Cup (2001–2018)
3. UEFA Futsal Champions League (2018–present)

== Editions ==
#	Season	Winners	Score	Runners-up	Losing semi-finalists		
1	2001–02	(Spain) Playas de Castellón	5–1	(Belgium) Action 21 Charleroi	(Croatia) MNK Split and (Portugal) Sporting CP		
2	2002–03	(Spain) Playas de Castellón	7–5 (1–1, 6–4)	(Belgium) Action 21 Charleroi	(Italy) Furpile Prato and (Spain) Inter FS		
3	2003–04	(Spain) Inter FS	7–5 (4–1, 3–4)	(Portugal) Benfica	(Belgium) Action 21 Charleroi and (Spain) Playas de Castellón		
4	2004–05	(Belgium) Action 21 Charleroi	10–9 (4–3, 6–6)	(Russia) Dinamo Moskva	(Spain) ElPozo Murcia and (Spain) Inter FS		
5	2005–06	(Spain) Inter FS	9–7 (6–3, 3–4)	(Russia) Dinamo Moskva	(Kazakhstan) Kairat Almaty and (Ukraine) Shakhtar Donetsk		
#	Season	Winners	Score	Runners-up	Third place	Score	Fourth place
6	2006–07	(Russia) Dinamo Moskva	2–1	(Spain) Inter FS	(Spain) ElPozo Murcia	1–1 (4–3 p)	(Belgium) Action 21 Charleroi
7	2007–08	(Russia) Viz-Sinara Yekaterinburg	4–4 (3–2 p)	(Spain) ElPozo Murcia	(Russia) Dinamo Moskva	5–0	(Kazakhstan) Kairat Almaty
8	2008–09	(Spain) Inter FS	5–1	(Russia) Viz-Sinara Yekaterinburg	(Kazakhstan) Kairat Almaty	1–0	(Russia) Dinamo Moskva
9	2009–10	(Portugal) Benfica	3–2 (a.e.t.)	(Spain) Inter FS	(Azerbaijan) Araz Naxçivan	2–2 (5–4 p)	(Italy) Luparense
10	2010–11	(Italy) Montesilvano	5–2	(Portugal) Sporting CP	(Kazakhstan) Kairat Almaty	3–3 (5–3 p)	(Portugal) Benfica
11	2011–12	(Spain) Barcelona	3–1	(Russia) Dinamo Moskva	(Italy) Marca Futsal	3–3 (4–3 p)	(Portugal) Sporting CP
12	2012–13	(Kazakhstan) Kairat Almaty	4–3	(Russia) Dinamo Moskva	(Spain) Barcelona	4–1	(Georgia (country)) Iberia Star Tbilisi
13	2013–14	(Spain) Barcelona	5–2 (a.e.t.)	(Russia) Dinamo Moskva	(Azerbaijan) Araz Naxçivan	6–4	(Kazakhstan) Kairat Almaty
14	2014–15	(Kazakhstan) Kairat Almaty	3–2	(Spain) Barcelona	(Portugal) Sporting CP	8–3	(Russia) Dina Moskva
15	2015–16	(Russia) Gazprom-Ugra Yugorsk	4–3	(Spain) Inter FS	(Portugal) Benfica	2–2 (2–0 p)	(Italy) ASD Pescara
16	2016–17	(Spain) Inter FS	7–0	(Portugal) Sporting CP	(Kazakhstan) Kairat Almaty	5–5 (3–2 p)	(Russia) Gazprom-Ugra Yugorsk
17	2017–18	(Spain) Inter FS	5–2	(Portugal) Sporting CP	(Spain) Barcelona	7–1	(Hungary) Győri ETO
18	2018–19	(Portugal) Sporting CP	2–1	(Kazakhstan) Kairat Almaty	(Spain) Barcelona	3–1	(Spain) Inter FS
19	2019–20	(Spain) Barcelona	2–1	(Spain) ElPozo Murcia	(Russia) KPRF	2–2 (3–1 p)	(Russia) Tyumen
#	Season	Winners	Score	Runners-up	Losing semi-finalists		
20	2020–21	(Portugal) Sporting CP	4–3	(Spain) Barcelona	(Spain) Inter FS and (Kazakhstan) Kairat		
#	Season	Winners	Score	Runners-up	Third place	Score	Fourth place
21	2021–22	(Spain) Barcelona	4–0	(Portugal) Sporting CP	(Portugal) Benfica	5–2	(France) ACCS Futsal
22	2022–23	(Spain) Palma Futsal	1–1 (5–3 p)	(Portugal) Sporting CP	(Portugal) Benfica	4–3	(Belgium) Anderlecht
23	2023–24	(Spain) Palma Futsal	5–1	(Spain) Barcelona	(Portugal) Benfica	6–3	(Portugal) Sporting CP
24	2024–25	(Spain) Palma Futsal	9–4	(Kazakhstan) Kairat Almaty	(Spain) Jimbee Cartagena	2–2 (3–1 p)	(Portugal) Sporting CP
25	2025–26	(Portugal) Sporting CP	2–0	(Spain) Palma Futsal	(Spain) Jimbee Cartagena	3–3 (5–4 p)	(France) Étoile Lavalloise MFC
26	2026–27						

== Records and statistics ==
=== Performance by team ===
Team	Winners	Runners-up	Years won	Years runners-up
(Spain) Inter FS	5	3	2004, 2006, 2009, 2017, 2018	2007, 2010, 2016
(Spain) Barcelona	4	3	2012, 2014, 2020, 2022	2015, 2021, 2024
(Portugal) Sporting CP	3	5	2019, 2021, 2026	2011, 2017, 2018, 2022, 2023
(Spain) Palma Futsal	3	1	2023, 2024, 2025	2026
(Kazakhstan) Kairat Almaty	2	2	2013, 2015	2019, 2025
(Spain) Playas de Castellón	2	0	2002, 2003	
(Russia) Dinamo Moskva	1	5	2007	2005, 2006, 2012, 2013, 2014
(Belgium) Action 21 Charleroi	1	2	2005	2002, 2003
(Russia) Viz-Sinara Yekaterinburg	1	1	2008	2009
(Portugal) Benfica	1	1	2010	2004
(Italy) Montesilvano	1	0	2011	
(Russia) Gazprom-Ugra Yugorsk	1	0	2016	
(Spain) ElPozo Murcia	0	2		2008, 2020
Total	25	25	—N/a	—N/a

=== Performance by country ===
Rank	Country	Winners	Runners-up	Total
1	Spain	14	9	23
2	Portugal	4	6	10
3	Russia	3	6	9
4	Kazakhstan	2	2	4
5	Belgium	1	2	3
6	Italy	1	0	1
Total		25	25	50

=== Top scorers ===
==== Top scorers by season ====
Season	Player	Team	Goals
2001–02	(Spain) Joan Linares	(Spain) Playas de Castellón	13
2002–03	(Belgium) André Vanderlei	(Belgium) Action 21 Charleroi	15
2003–04	(Belgium) André Vanderlei	(Belgium) Action 21 Charleroi	19
2004–05	(Russia) Sergei Ivanov	(Russia) Dinamo Moskva	14
2005–06	(Serbia) Predrag Rajić	(Serbia) Marbo Beograd	12
2006–07	(Ukraine) Sergey Sytin	(Ukraine) Shakhtar Donetsk	10
2007–08	(Belgium) Karim Bali	(Belgium) Topsport Antwerpen	13
2008–09	(Netherlands) Samir Makhoukhi	(Netherlands) FC Blok Beverwijk	9
2009–10	(Portugal) Joel Queirós	(Portugal) Benfica	12
2010–11	(France) Chimel Vita Nzaka	(France) Kremlin Bicêtre	16
2011–12	(Romania) Ion Al-Ioani	(Hungary) Győri ETO	13
2012–13	(Brazil) Betinho	(France) Sporting Paris	10
2012–13	(Slovenia) Alen Fetić	(Slovenia) FC Litija	10
2012–13	(Brazil) Diniz Pinheiro	(France) Sporting Paris	10
2012–13	(Belgium) Amar Zouggaghi	(Belgium) Topsport Antwerpen	10
2013–14	(Brazil) Betinho	(France) Sporting Paris	11
2014–15	(Brazil) Café	(France) Sporting Paris	10
2014–15	(Equatorial Guinea) Roberto Tobe	(England) Baku United	10
2014–15	(Russia) Dmitri Prudnikov	(Russia) MFK Dina Moskva	10
2015–16	(Russia) Eder Lima	(Russia) Gazprom-Ugra Yugorsk	13
2016–17	(Azerbaijan) Thiago Bolinha	(Azerbaijan) Araz Naxçivan	9
2016–17	(Slovenia) Alen Fetić	(Slovenia) Brezje Maribor	9
2016–17	(Brazil) Nenê	(Cyprus) APOEL Nicosia	9
2016–17	(Finland) Rami Tirkkonen	(Finland) Sievi Futsal	9
2016–17	(Slovenia) Denis Totošković	(Slovenia) Brezje Maribor	9
2017–18	(Albania) Halim Selmanaj	(Kosovo) Liburni Gjakovë	12
2018–19	(Poland) Michał Kubik	(Poland) Rekord Bielsko-Biała	10
2019–20	(Brazil) Renan Roberto Mantelli	(Cyprus) Omonia	16
2020–21	(Ukraine) Petro Shoturma	(Ukraine) Prodexim Kherson	7
2021–22	(Bosnia and Herzegovina) Mirko Marinković	(Austria) Diamant Linz	11
2022–23	(Brazil) Vinicius Lazzaretti	(Poland) Piast Gliwice	11
2023–24	(Brazil) Thalles Henrique	(Latvia) Riga FC	15
2024–25	(Italy) Michele Podda	(Italy) Catania Calcio	11
2025–26	(Netherlands) Soufian Charraoui	(Netherlands) Tigers Roermond	11

==== Final tournament top scorers ====
Season	Player	Team	Goals	Ref
2006–07	(Brazil) Kelson	(Russia) Dinamo Moskva	2	
2006–07	(Russia) Pula	(Russia) Dinamo Moskva	2	
2006–07	(Belgium) Karim Chaibai	(Belgium) Action 21 Charleroi	2	
2007–08	(Ukraine) Ildar Makayev	(Russia) Viz-Sinara Ekaterinburg	2	
2007–08	(Russia) Vladislav Shayakhmetov	(Russia) Viz-Sinara Ekaterinburg	2	
2007–08	(Russia) Dmitri Prudnikov	(Russia) Viz-Sinara Ekaterinburg	2	
2007–08	(Brazil) Ciço	(Spain) ElPozo Murcia	2	
2008–09	(Brazil) Schumacher	(Spain) Inter FS	3	
2009–10	(Portugal) Joel Queirós	(Portugal) Benfica	3	
2009–10	(Portugal) Arnaldo Pereira	(Portugal) Benfica	3	
2010–11	(Brazil) Leo Santana	(Kazakhstan) Kairat Almaty	3	
2011–12	(Brazil) Wilde	(Spain) Barcelona	3	
2012–13	(Georgia (country)) Fumaça	(Kazakhstan) Kairat Almaty	4	
2013–14	(Italy) Adriano Foglia	(Azerbaijan) Araz Naxçivan	3	
2014–15	(Kazakhstan) Leo Jaraguá	(Kazakhstan) Kairat Almaty	4	
2014–15	(Russia) Leandro Esquerdinha	(Russia) Dina Moskva	4	
2014–15	(Brazil) Alex Martins	(Portugal) Sporting CP	4	
2015–16	(Russia) Andrei Afanasyev	(Russia) Gazprom-Ugra Yugorsk	3	
2016–17	(Portugal) Ricardinho	(Spain) Inter FS	4	
2017–18	(Russia) Leandro Esquerdinha	(Spain) Barcelona	4	
2018–19	(Brazil) Dieguinho	(Portugal) Sporting CP	3	
2019–20	(Russia) Yanar Asadov	(Russia) KPRF	2	
2020–21	(Brazil) Ferrão	(Spain) Barcelona	5	
2021–22	(Brazil) Ferrão	(Spain) Barcelona	2	
2021–22	(Brazil) Dyego Zuffo	(Spain) Barcelona	2	
2021–22	(France) Nelson Lutin	(France) ACCS	2	
2021–22	(Italy) Alex Merlim	(Portugal) Sporting CP	2	
2021–22	(Iran) Hossein Tayyebi	(Portugal) Benfica	2	
2022–23	(Russia) Ivan Chishkala	(Portugal) Benfica	3	
2023–24	(Portugal) Lúcio Rocha	(Portugal) Benfica	5	
2024–25	(Brazil) Fabinho	(Spain) Palma	4	
2025–26	(Brazil) Fabinho	(Spain) Palma	3	
2025–26	(France) Ouassini Guirio	(France) Étoile Lavalloise	3	

==== All-time top scorers ====
Rank	Player	Team(s)	Goals
1	(Portugal) Ricardinho	(Portugal) Benfica, (Spain) Inter FS, (France) ACCS Futsal, (Latvia) Riga Futsal Club	60
2	(Belgium) André Vanderlei	(Belgium) Action 21 Charleroi, (Belgium) Châtelineau Futsal	54
3	(Belgium) Lúcio	(Belgium) Action 21 Charleroi, (Georgia (country)) Iberia Star, (Belgium) Futsal Charleroi	50
4	(Azerbaijan) Vitaliy Borisov	(Azerbaijan) AMMK Baku, (Azerbaijan) Olimpik, (Azerbaijan) Araz Naxçivan, (Serbia) KMF Ekonomac	45
5	(Russia) Cirilo	(Russia) MFK Dinamo Moskva, (Latvia) Lokomotiv Daugavpils	44
6	(Italy) Diego Cavinato	(Portugal) Sporting CP	43
7	(Brazil) Schumacher	(Spain) Inter FS	41
8	(Brazil) Alex Martins	(Belgium) Action 21 Charleroi, (Portugal) Sporting CP	40
8	(Portugal) Arnaldo Pereira	(Portugal) Benfica, (Latvia) FK Nikars, (England) Baku United	40
8	(Portugal) Leo Conceição	(Belgium) Action 21 Charleroi	40

=== Players records ===
Record	Date	Game	Player	Age
Youngest player in the history of UEFA Futsal Cup participating in a game	3 October 2010	(Greece) Athina 90 3-9 Time Lviv	(Greece) Panagiotis Paouris	13 years, 9 months and 17 days
Youngest player in the history of UEFA Futsal Cup scoring a goal	3 October 2010	(Greece) Athina 90 3-9 Time Lviv	(Greece) Panagiotis Paouris	13 years, 9 months and 17 days

== Broadcasters ==
The final four round is streamed at UEFA.tv in the unsold markets with highlights available in all territories.

=== 2024–2027 ===
==== Europe ====
Country/Region	Broadcaster	
	Free	Pay
Andorra		DAZN
Portugal	Canal 11	DAZN
Spain		DAZN
Spain	IB3	Movistar Plus+
Belarus		Start
Russia		Start
Croatia		Zona Sport
Cyprus		Cytavision
France	L'Équipe	
Greece		Cosmote Sport
Israel		Sport 5
Italy		Sky Sport
Kazakhstan	QAZTRK	Quest Media
Romania		Prima Sport
Ukraine		Megogo

==== Outside Europe ====
Country/Region	Broadcaster	
	Free	Pay
Brazil	Canal Gol Brasil	
Kyrgyzstan		Quest Media
Tajikistan		Quest Media
Turkmenistan	Turkmenistan Sport	Quest Media
Uzbekistan	Zo'r TV	Quest Media
United States	CBS	Paramount+

== See also ==
- Futsal European Clubs Championship
- European Futsal Cup Winners Cup
- European Women's Futsal Tournament
- UEFA Women's Futsal Champions League - Proposed
- Intercontinental Futsal Cup
- European Universities Futsal Championships
- UEFA Futsal Championship
- UEFA Women's Futsal Championship
- UEFA Under-21 Futsal Championship
- UEFA Under-19 Futsal Championship
- Futsal Finalissima
- UEFS Futsal Men's Championship
- UEFS Futsal Women's Championship
- International Masters Cup Futsal
- ISTRIA Futsal Masters Cup
