= 2001–02 UEFA Futsal Cup =

Final positions
- Champions: (Spain) Playas de Castellón FS
- Runners-up: (Belgium) Action 21 Charleroi

The 2001–02 UEFA Futsal Cup was the 16th edition of Europe's premier club futsal tournament and the 1st edition under the current UEFA Futsal Cup format.

== Preliminary round ==
Key to colours in group tables
Teams progressed to the Final tournament – Group stage

=== Group 1 ===
Team	Pts	Pld	W	D	L	GF	GA
(Belgium) Action 21 Charleroi	9	3	3	0	0	28	4
(Cyprus) AGBU Ararat	4	3	1	1	1	14	22
(Czech Republic) Pramen Havlíčkův Brod	3	3	1	0	2	16	20
(Georgia (country)) Iberia	1	3	0	1	2	14	26

Pramen	3–7	Charleroi
Iberia	7–7	AGBU Ararat
Pramen	7–6	Iberia
Charleroi	9–0	AGBU Ararat
AGBU Ararat	7–6	Pramen
Charleroi	12–1	Iberia

=== Group 2 ===
Team	Pts	Pld	W	D	L	GF	GA
(Italy) Roma Calcio a 5	9	3	3	0	0	27	1
(Azerbaijan) Turan Air	6	3	2	0	1	10	6
(Armenia) Araks Yerevan	3	3	1	0	2	6	24
(Moldova) Memphis Tiraspol	0	3	0	0	3	0	12

Araks	3–0	Memphis
Roma	4–0	Turan Air
Turan Air	5–0	Memphis
Roma	19–1	Araks
Turan Air	5–2	Araks
Memphis	0–4	Roma

=== Group 3 ===
Team	Pts	Pld	W	D	L	GF	GA
(Croatia) MNK Split	9	3	3	0	0	13	1
(Lithuania) Inkaras Kaunas	6	3	2	0	1	9	8
(Belarus) Simurg Minsk	3	3	1	0	2	8	10
(Greece) Doukas SAC	0	3	0	0	3	3	14

Split	7–0	Simurg
Doukas	3–5	Inkaras
Split	3–0	Doukas
Simurg	2–3	Inkaras
Inkaras	1–3	Split
Simurg	6–0	Doukas

=== Group 4 ===
Team	Pts	Pld	W	D	L	GF	GA
(Poland) Clearex Chorzów	6	3	2	0	0	10	7
(Russia) Spartak Moskva	3	3	1	0	1	8	8
(Slovakia) Program Dubnica	0	3	0	0	2	6	9

Spartak	4–5	Chorzow
Dubnica	3–4	Spartak
Chorzow	5–3	Dubnica

=== Group 5 ===
Team	Pts	Pld	W	D	L	GF	GA
(Portugal) Sporting	6	3	2	0	0	14	3
(Finland) FT Kemi-Tornio	3	3	1	0	1	6	6
(Andorra) Buick Encamp	0	3	0	0	2	2	13

Sporting	8–2	Encamp
Tornio	1–6	Sporting
Encamp	0–5	Tornio

=== Group 6 ===
Team	Pts	Pld	W	D	L	GF	GA
(Spain) Playas de Castellón	6	3	2	0	0	15	4
(Slovenia) Lesna Industrija Litija	3	3	1	0	1	7	5
(North Macedonia) Vetadžoka	0	3	0	0	2	3	16

Castellón	4–2	Litija
Vetadžoka	2–11	Castellón
Litija	5–1	Vetadžoka

=== Group 7 ===
Team	Pts	Pld	W	D	L	GF	GA
(Bosnia and Herzegovina) Kaskada Gračanica	3	3	1	0	1	12	6
(Serbia and Montenegro) CD Shop Mozart Danilovgrad	3	3	1	0	1	7	7
(Netherlands) West Stars	3	3	1	0	1	6	12

West Stars	4–3	Danilovgrad
Danilovgrad	4–3	Gračanica
Gračanica	9–2	West Stars

=== Group 8 ===
Team	Pts	Pld	W	D	L	GF	GA
(Hungary) Üllő FC Cső-Montage	4	3	1	1	0	13	4
(Ukraine) InterKrAZ Kyiv	4	3	1	1	0	11	3
(Latvia) FK Policijas	0	3	0	0	2	3	20

InterKrAZ	2–2	Üllő FC
Policijas	1–9	InterKrAZ
Üllő FC	11–2	Policijas

== Final phase ==
Key to colours in group tables
Teams progressed to the Final tournament – Semifinals

=== Group A ===
Team	Pts	Pld	W	D	L	GF	GA
(Croatia) MNK Split	7	3	2	1	0	8	2
(Portugal) Sporting	5	3	1	2	0	8	6
(Italy) Roma Calcio a 5	4	3	1	1	1	15	9
(Bosnia and Herzegovina) Kaskada Gračanica	0	3	0	0	3	5	19

Split	2–0	Roma
Sporting	3–1	Gracanica
Roma	10–2	Gracanica
Split	0–0	Sporting
Gracanica	2–6	Split
Roma	5–5	Sporting

=== Group B ===
Team	Pts	Pld	W	D	L	GF	GA
(Spain) Playas de Castellón	9	3	3	0	0	19	2
(Belgium) Action 21 Charleroi	6	3	2	0	1	11	10
(Hungary) Üllő FC Cső-Montage	3	3	1	0	2	12	15
(Poland) Clearex Chorzów	0	3	0	0	3	3	18

Charleroi	7–5	Üllő FC
Chorzów	0–9	Castellon
Charleroi	3–2	Chorzów
Üllő FC	1–7	Castellon
Castellon	3–1	Charleroi
Üllő FC	6–1	Chorzów

== Knockout stage ==
=== Semi-finals ===
2 March 2002	(Spain) Playas de Castellón	4–0	Sporting Portugal	Pavilhão Atlântico, Lisbon
15:00 CEST

2 March 2002	(Croatia) MNK Split	3–7	(Belgium) Action 21 Charleroi	Pavilhão Atlântico, Lisbon
17:00 CEST

=== Final ===
The 2002 UEFA Futsal Cup Final was played at 15:00 CEST on 3 March 2002 at the Pavilhão Atlântico in Lisbon, Portugal. Playas de Castellón won the match 5–1.

3 March 2002	(Spain) Playas de Castellón	5–1	(Belgium) Action 21 Charleroi	Pavilhão Atlântico, Lisbon
15:00 CEST				Attendance: 1500

UEFA Futsal Cup
2001–02 Winners

Playas de Castellón
1st Title
