= Rafael Durval da Costa Lira =

Brazilian-born Azerbaijani futsal player

Rafael
Personal information
- Full name: Rafael Durval da Costa Lira
- Date of birth: 26 December 1982 (age 43)
- Place of birth: Brazil
- Position: Defender

Team information
- Current team: Mimel Lučenec
- Number: 15

Senior career*
Years	Team	Apps	(Gls)
- Sibiryak
- Araz Naxçivan
- Nacional Zagreb

International career
- Azerbaijan
- * Club domestic league appearances and goals

Rafael Durval da Costa Lira or simply Rafael (born 26 December 1982) is a Brazilian born, Azerbaijani futsal player who plays for Mimel Lučenec and the Azerbaijan national futsal team.
