= 2002–03 UEFA Futsal Cup =

Final positions
- Champions: (Spain) Playas de Castellón FS
- Runners-up: (Belgium) Action 21 Charleroi

The 2002–03 UEFA Futsal Cup was the 17th edition of Europe's premier club futsal tournament and the 2nd edition under the current UEFA Futsal Cup format.

== First qualifying round ==
Key to colours in group tables
Teams progressed to the Second qualifying round

=== Group 1 ===
Team	Pts	Pld	W	D	L	GF	GA
(Belgium) Action 21 Charleroi	9	3	3	0	0	38	3
(Slovakia) Program Dubnica	6	3	2	0	1	30	7
(Lithuania) Inkaras Kaunas	3	3	1	0	2	12	11
(Albania) KS Flamurtari Valona	0	3	0	0	3	7	66

Charleroi	6–0	Inkaras
Dubnica	27–2	Flamurtari
Charleroi	5–2	Dubnica
Inkaras	12–4	Flamurtari
Flamurtari	1–27	Charleroi
Inkaras	0–1	Dubnica

=== Group 2 ===
Team	Pts	Pld	W	D	L	GF	GA
(Ukraine) MFC Shakhtar Donetsk	9	3	3	0	0	40	2
(Moldova) FC Zaria Bąlţi	6	3	2	0	1	12	9
(Finland) FT Kemi-Tornio	1	3	0	1	2	3	23
(Cyprus) Ararat Nicosia	1	3	0	1	2	2	23

Ararat	0–1	Zaria
Shakhtar	12–0	Tornio
Shakhtar	20–0	Ararat
Tornio	1–9	Zaria
Zaria	2–8	Shakhtar
Tornio	2–2	Ararat

=== Group 3 ===
Team	Pts	Pld	W	D	L	GF	GA
(Russia) Norilsky Nickel	7	3	2	1	0	18	6
(Portugal) AR Freixieiro	6	3	2	0	1	8	7
(Georgia (country)) Iberia Tbilisi	4	3	1	1	1	10	9
(Latvia) PFK Olimp	0	3	0	0	3	1	15

Freixieiro	1–4	Norilsk
Iberia	3–0	Olimp
Norilsk	9–0	Olimp
Freixieiro	4–2	Iberia
Olimp	1–3	Freixieiro
Norlsk	5–5	Iberia

=== Group 4 ===
Team	Pts	Pld	W	D	L	GF	GA
(Italy) Prato Calcio a 5	9	3	3	0	0	23	7
(North Macedonia) Futsal Team Skopje	4	3	1	1	1	14	13
(Slovenia) Lesna Industrija Litija	4	3	1	1	1	16	20
(Armenia) Hayk Yerevan	0	3	0	0	3	10	23

Prato	9–3	Litija
Hayk	3–6	Skopje
Prato	9–1	Hayk
Litija	5–5	Skopje
Skopje	3–5	Prato
Litija	8–6	Hayk

=== Group 5 ===
Team	Pts	Pld	W	D	L	GF	GA
(Spain) Boomerang Interviú	9	3	3	0	0	23	7
(Poland) Clearex Chorzów	4	3	1	1	1	14	13
(Bosnia and Herzegovina) Karaka Mostar	4	3	1	1	1	16	20
(Kazakhstan) Kairat Almaty	0	3	0	0	3	10	23

Interviu	6–1	Chorzów
Mostar	3–1	Almaty
Interviu	5–1	Mostar
Chorzów	4–4	Almaty
Almaty	1–11	Interviu
Chorzów	2–0	Mostar

=== Group 6 ===
Team	Pts	Pld	W	D	L	GF	GA
(Spain) Playas de Castellón	9	3	3	0	0	36	4
(Belarus) Dorozhnik Minsk	6	3	2	0	1	17	10
(Hungary) Üllő FC Cső-Montage	3	3	1	0	2	16	15
(Andorra) UE Santa Coloma	0	3	0	0	3	1	41

Minsk	8–0	S.Coloma
Castellon	7–2	Üllő FC
Ullo FC	11–0	S.Coloma
Castellon	7–1	Minsk
Üllő	3–8	Minsk
S.Coloma	1–22	Castellon

=== Group 7 ===
Team	Pts	Pld	W	D	L	GF	GA
(Croatia) MNK Split	6	3	2	0	0	7	2
(Czech Republic) Jistebník Ostrava	3	3	1	0	1	6	8
(Netherlands) FCK De Hommel	0	3	0	0	2	5	8

Split	3–1	De Hommel
Ostrava	1–4	Split
De Hommel	4–5	Ostrava

=== Group 8 ===
Team	Pts	Pld	W	D	L	GF	GA
(Serbia and Montenegro) KMF Niš	6	3	2	0	0	8	3
(Azerbaijan) Turan Air Baku	3	3	1	0	1	4	6
(Greece) Futsal Club Athina	0	3	0	0	2	4	7

Baku	1–4	Niš
Athina	2–3	Baku
Niš	4–2	Athina

== Second qualifying round ==
=== Group A ===
Team	Pts	Pld	W	D	L	GF	GA	Tie-breaker for	Tie-breaker against
(Belgium) Action 21 Charleroi	6	3	2	0	1	16	12	12	12
(Spain) Boomerang Interviu	6	3	2	0	1	21	9	8	8
(Russia) Norilsky Nickel	6	3	2	0	1	11	10	7	7
(Croatia) MNK Split	0	3	0	0	3	4	21		

Interviu	13–1	Split
Charleroi	7–4	Norilsk
Norilsk	4–3	Split
Charleroi	5–8	Interviu
Norilsk	3–0	Interviu
Split	0–4	Charleroi

=== Group B ===
Team	Pts	Pld	W	D	L	GF	GA
(Spain) Playas de Castellón	9	3	3	0	0	17	8
(Italy) Prato Calcio a 5	4	3	1	1	1	9	10
(Ukraine) MFC Shakhtar Donetsk	3	3	1	0	2	9	11
(Serbia and Montenegro) KMF Niš	1	3	0	1	2	7	13

Castellon	6–2	Niš
Shakhtar	1–4	Prato
Shakhtar	4–5	Castellon
Prato	3–3	Niš
Niš	2–4	Shakhtar
Prato	2–6	Castellon

== Finals ==
The 2003 UEFA Futsal Cup Final was played on April 16, 2003 at the La Garenne in Charleroi, Belgium and May 3, 2003 at the Pabellón Ciudad de Castellón in Castellón, Spain. Playas de Castellón won 7–5 on aggregate.

16 April 2003	(Belgium) Action 21 Charleroi	1–1	(Spain) Playas de Castellón	La Garenne, Charleroi
				Attendance: 2200

3 May 2003	(Spain) Playas de Castellón	6–4	(Belgium) Action 21 Charleroi	Pabellón Ciudad de Castellón, Castellón
				Attendance: 4500

UEFA Futsal Cup
2002–03 Winners

Playas de Castellón
2nd Title
