= Championnat de France de Futsal =

French futsal league

- Founded: 2009
- Country: France
- Confederation: UEFA
- Number of clubs: 12
- Level on pyramid: 1
- Relegation to: D2
- Domestic cup: Coupe Nationale Futsal
- International cup: UEFA Futsal Champions League
- Current champions: Étoile Lavalloise MFC (2025/26)
- Most championships: Sporting Club de Paris (5)
- Current: Current Season at UEFA.com

The Championnat de France de Futsal "Division 1" or "D1" is the premier futsal league in France, organized by Fédération Française de Football. There are 12 teams in the first level, the team ranked first wins the title of national Champion and qualifies for the UEFA Futsal Cup. The teams ranked 11th and 12th are relegated to Division 2.

"D2" is the second level, and has two groups with 10 teams each. The teams ranked first in each group are promoted to Division 1. The teams ranked 8th to 10th in each group are relegated. Below is the regional level.

== Champions ==
- Challenge National

Season	Winner
2007/2008	Roubaix Futsal
2008/2009	Issy Futsal

- Championnat de France

Season	Winner
2009/2010	Kremlin-Bicêtre United
2010/2011	Sporting Club de Paris
2011/2012	Sporting Club de Paris
2012/2013	Sporting Club de Paris
2013/2014	Sporting Club de Paris
2014/2015	Kremlin-Bicêtre United
2015/2016	Kremlin-Bicêtre United
2016/2017	ASC Garges Djibson
2017/2018	Kremlin-Bicêtre United
2018/2019	Toulon Élite Futsal
2019/2020	Cancelled due to the COVID-19 pandemic in France
2020/2021	ACCS
2021/2022	Sporting Club de Paris
2022/2023	Étoile Lavalloise MFC
2023/2024	Étoile Lavalloise MFC
2024/2025	Étoile Lavalloise MFC
2025/2026	Étoile Lavalloise MFC
