= Café (futsal player) =

Brazilian futsal player

Personal information
- Full name: Bruno Loureiro Barros
- Date of birth: 28 January 1985 (age 41)
- Place of birth: Petrópolis, Rio de Janeiro, Brazil
- Position: Striker

Team information
- Current team: Krona

Senior career*
Years	Team	Apps	(Gls)
2004	Macaé		
2005–2006	Petrópolis		
2007–2010	Sporting		
2010–2011	Krona		
2011–2012	Foolad Mahan		
2012–	Krona		

International career
- Brazil
- * Club domestic league appearances and goals

Bruno Loureiro Barros (born 28 January 1985), commonly known as Café, is a Brazilian futsal player.
