= FK Nikars =

Latvian football club

- Full name: FK Nikars Rīga
- Founded: 2002
- Ground: Olympic Sports Centre, Riga, Latvia
- Capacity: 2,000
- Chairman: Raimonds Valts
- Manager: Orlando Francisco Alves Duarte
- League: Latvian Higher Futsal League
- 2018-2019: Premier League, 1st
| Home colours | Away colours |

FK Nikars Riga is a futsal club based in Riga, Latvia. It has been one of the dominant teams in the Latvian Futsal Higher League, winning 11 championship titles in a row from 2008 to 2019.

In June 2019, the club announced that it will disband its main team and withdraw from national and European tournaments. However, there had been reports of financial issues in the previous seasons, with the LFF stating that after the 2018–19 season the club was likely to be relegated due to long-time financial irregularities.

== Honours ==
- Latvian Futsal Premier League champions (11)
  - 2007–08, 2008–09, 2009–10, 2010–11, 2011–12, 2012–13, 2013–14, 2015–16, 2016–17, 2017–18, 2018–19

== Current squad ==
Note: Flags indicate national team as defined under FIFA eligibility rules; some limited exceptions apply. Players may hold more than one non-FIFA nationality.

| No. | Pos. | Nation | Player |
|---|---|---|---|
| 1 | GK | LVA | Antons Astrahancevs |
| 2 | DF | LVA | Jānis Pastars |
| 3 | FW | LVA | Andrejs Aleksejevs |
| 5 | DF | LVA | Igors Dacko |
| 6 | DF | LVA | Konstantins Zabarovskis |
| 7 | FW | LVA | Maksims Seņs |
| 9 | FW | LVA | Artūrs Jerofejevs |
| 9 | FW | LVA | Artjoms Koļesņikovs |
| 10 | FW | BRA | Ewerton |
| 11 | FW | LVA | Igors Avanesovs |

| No. | Pos. | Nation | Player |
|---|---|---|---|
| 12 | FW | BRA | Wanderson |
| 14 | DF | LVA | Germans Matjušenko |
| 16 | GK | LVA | Kaspars Nerets |
| 17 | DF | LVA | Dmitrijs Zabarovskis |
| 18 | FW | LVA | Andrejs Baklanovs |
| 19 | DF | LVA | Romans Rožkovskis |
| 20 | GK | LVA | Renārs Šķesters-Kambals |
| 21 | FW | LVA | Jurijs Arhipovs-Prokofjevs |
