= 2016–17 Mitropa Futsal Cup =

Tournament details
- Dates: 14 August 2016
- Teams: 4 (from 4 associations)

Final positions
- Champions: (Hungary) Győri ETO Futsal Club (2nd title)
- Runners-up: (Czech Republic) FC Tango Hodonin
- Third place: (Austria) Stella Rossa Wien
- Fourth place: (Germany) TV Wackersdorf

Tournament statistics
- Matches played: 6
- Goals scored: 44 (7.33 per match)
- Top scorer(s): (Spain) Alex (8 goals)
- All statistics correct as of 2 September 2017.

The 2017–18 Mitropa Futsal Cup was the 8th edition of The Mitropa Futsal Cup, an annual international futsal competition, which took place on August 14, 2016, at the Sporthalle Hollgasse in Vienna. It did feature futsal teams from Austria, Hungary, The Czech Republic and Germany.

Győri ETO Futsal Club were the defending champions.

== Participating teams ==
Austria; Austrian Futsal Liga	Hungary; Nemzeti Bajnokság I (men's futsal)	Germany; Futsal-Regionalliga Süd	Czech Republic; Czech Futsal First League
Stella Rossa Wien (hosts)	Győri ETO Futsal Club (title defenders)	TV Wackersdorf (first appearance)	FC Tango Hodonin (first appearance)

== Standings ==
Team	Pld	W	D	L	GF	GA	GD	Pts
(Hungary) Győri ETO Futsal Club	3	2	1	0	23	1	+22	7
(Czech Republic) FC Tango Hodonin	3	1	2	0	9	6	+3	5
(Austria) Stella Rossa Wien	3	1	0	2	7	12	−5	3
(Germany) TV Wackersdorf	3	0	1	2	5	25	−20	1

== Fixtures and results ==
=== Stella Rossa Wien vs TV Wackersdorf ===
14 August 2016
13:00 CET

Stella Rossa Wien (Austria)	6–1	(Germany) TV Wackersdorf
Rosen Petrov 9' 14'; Djorde Miletic 27' 38'; Vaso Vojnovic 34'; Jakov Josic 40'	Report	Sinan Özdemir 39'

Sporthalle Hollgasse, Vienna
Attendance: 300

Dalibor Kalajdzic
Felipe Fernandez
Patrik Barbic
Vaso Vojnovic (c)
Petar Crnogorcevic
David Rajkovic
Rosen Petrov
Rami Saad
Djorde Miletic
Jakov Josic
Dalibor Dervisevic
Branko Milutinovic
Milan Sapardić
Dragan Radosavljevic
Nikola Vasiljević
Slaven Lalic
Manager:
(Austria) Aleksandar Ristovski

GK	85	(Bulgaria) Borislav Stoyanov
DF	79	(Germany) Markus Giesecke
DF	13	(Bosnia and Herzegovina) Mesko Becirovic
DF	17	(Bulgaria) Stoyan Stoykov (c)
FW	7	(Serbia) Filip Hristov
FW	58	(Germany) Ilhan Koc
FW	10	(Turkey) Sinan Özdemir
FW	4	(Serbia) Boris Radisavljevic
FW	9	(Bulgaria) Yulian Kurtelov
Manager:
(Serbia) Boris Radisavljevic

=== Győri ETO Futsal Club vs FC Tango Hodonin ===
14 August 2016
14:00 CET

Győri ETO Futsal Club (Hungary)	1–1	(Czech Republic) FC Tango Hodonin
Leandrinho 18'	Report	Dimostenis Chadzidis 36'

Sporthalle Hollgasse, Vienna
Attendance: 300

Gábor Matkovics
Bognár Bálint
Ádám Vas
Richard David
Leandrinho
Juanra
Davide Moura
Alex
Kristóf Sáhó
Michal Seidler
Manager:
(Spain) Marcos Angulo

Jakub Dvořák
Michal Lupač
Tomáš Buršík
Čeněk Cenek
Lukáš Černek
Bohumír Doubravský
Dimostenis Chadzidis
Milan Svoboda
Jakub Řezníček
Radim Vlček
Manager:

=== TV Wackersdorf vs Győri ETO Futsal Club ===
14 August 2016
15:30 CET

TV Wackersdorf (Germany)	0–15	(Hungary) Győri ETO Futsal Club
	Report	Alex 3' 5' 6' 16' 22' 39'; Bognár Bálint 8' 23'; Davide Moura 14'; Michal Seidler 18' 32' 33'; Juanra 24' 35' 37'

Sporthalle Hollgasse, Vienna
Attendance: 300

GK	85	(Bulgaria) Borislav Stoyanov
DF	79	(Germany) Markus Giesecke
DF	13	(Bosnia and Herzegovina) Mesko Becirovic
DF	17	(Bulgaria) Stoyan Stoykov (c)
FW	7	(Serbia) Filip Hristov
FW	58	(Germany) Ilhan Koc
FW	10	(Turkey) Sinan Özdemir
FW	4	(Serbia) Boris Radisavljevic
FW	9	(Bulgaria) Yulian Kurtelov
Manager:
(Serbia) Boris Radisavljevic

Gábor Matkovics
Bognár Bálint
Ádám Vas
Richard David
Leandrinho
Juanra
Davide Moura
Alex
Kristóf Sáhó
Michal Seidler
Manager: (Spain) Marcos Angulo

=== Stella Rossa Wien vs FC Tango Hodonin ===
14 August 2016
16:30 CET

Stella Rossa Wien (Austria)	1–4	(Czech Republic) FC Tango Hodonin
Patrik Barbic 24'	Report	Bohumír Doubravský 17'; Radim Vlček 26'; Jakub Řezníček 32'; Tomáš Buršík 35'

Sporthalle Hollgasse, Vienna
Attendance: 300

Dalibor Kalajdzic
Felipe Fernandez
Patrik Barbic
Vaso Vojnovic (c)
Petar Crnogorcevic
David Rajkovic
Rosen Petrov
Rami Saad
Djorde Miletic
Jakov Josic
Dalibor Dervisevic
Branko Milutinovic
Milan Sapardić
Dragan Radosavljevic
Nikola Vasiljević
Slaven Lalic
Manager:
(Austria) Aleksandar Ristovski

Jakub Dvořák
Michal Lupač
Tomáš Buršík
Čeněk Cenek
Lukáš Černek
Bohumír Doubravský
Dimostenis Chadzidis
Milan Svoboda
Jakub Řezníček
Radim Vlček
Manager:

=== FC Tango Hodonin vs TV Wackersdorf ===
14 August 2016
18:00 CET

FC Tango Hodonin (Czech Republic)	4–4	(Germany) TV Wackersdorf
Radim Vlček 15' 26'; Dimostenis Chadzidis 20'; Tomáš Buršík 22'	Report	Sinan Özdemir 21' 39'; Yulian Kurtelov 30' 37'

Sporthalle Hollgasse, Vienna
Attendance: 300

Jakub Dvořák
Michal Lupač
Tomáš Buršík
Čeněk Cenek
Lukáš Černek
Bohumír Doubravský
Dimostenis Chadzidis
Milan Svoboda
Jakub Řezníček
Radim Vlček
Manager:

GK	85	(Bulgaria) Borislav Stoyanov
DF	79	(Germany) Markus Giesecke
DF	13	(Bosnia and Herzegovina) Mesko Becirovic
DF	17	(Bulgaria) Stoyan Stoykov (c)
FW	7	(Serbia) Filip Hristov
FW	58	(Germany) Ilhan Koc
FW	10	(Turkey) Sinan Özdemir
FW	4	(Serbia) Boris Radisavljevic
FW	9	(Bulgaria) Yulian Kurtelov
Manager:
(Serbia) Boris Radisavljevic

=== Stella Rossa Wien vs Győri ETO Futsal Club ===
14 August 2016
19:00 CET

Stella Rossa Wien (Austria)	0-7	(Hungary) Győri ETO Futsal Club
	Report	Ádám Vas 11'; Michal Seidler 16' 32'; Alex 19' 25'; Davide Moura 23'; Juanra 26'

Sporthalle Hollgasse, Vienna
Attendance: 300

Dalibor Kalajdzic
Felipe Fernandez
Patrik Barbic
Vaso Vojnovic (c)
Petar Crnogorcevic
David Rajkovic
Rosen Petrov
Rami Saad
Djorde Miletic
Jakov Josic
Dalibor Dervisevic
Branko Milutinovic
Milan Sapardić
Dragan Radosavljevic
Nikola Vasiljević
Slaven Lalic
Manager:
(Austria) Aleksandar Ristovski

Gábor Matkovics
Bognár Bálint
Ádám Vas
Richard David
Leandrinho
Juanra
Davide Moura
Alex
Kristóf Sáhó
Michal Seidler
Manager:
(Spain) Marcos Angulo

== Top goalscorers ==
Rank	Player	Team	Goals
1	(Spain) Alex	Győri ETO Futsal Club	8
2	(Czech Republic) Michal Seidler	Győri ETO Futsal Club	5
3	(Spain) Juanra	Győri ETO Futsal Club	4
4	(Turkey) Sinan Özdemir	TV Wackersdorf	3
5	(Czech Republic) Radim Vlček	FC Tango Hodonin	3
