= Futsal in Germany =

The highest German futsal league is the Futsal Bundesliga, ten teams play against each other in the league system. At the end of the regular season there is a championship round in which the German champions are played out. The bottom of the table is relegated directly to one of the five subordinate regional leagues. The penultimate plays with the champions of the five regional leagues in a relegation. Among them, the second highest league is one of the five regional leagues, called the Regionalliga. The winner of the respective regional futsal league has the chance to take part in the qualifying matches (relegation) for the Futsal-Bundesliga. The Bundesliga champions qualify for the UEFA Futsal Champions League.

== Current hierarchical divisional breakdowns ==
As of 28 September 2021

- Futsal Bundesliga
- Regionalliga: 4 divisions e.g. Futsal-Regionalliga Süd
- Oberliga: 12 divisions e.g. Futsal-Bayernliga
- Verbandsliga
- Landesliga
- Bezirksliga
- Kreisliga

== German teams in international futsal competitions ==
Futsal development in Germany is governed and supported by the German Football Association and it is going forward in record time, with some saying that Germany is a sleeping giant in that sport. The first German side to qualify for the UEFA Futsal Cup was UFC Muenster in the 2006-07 season, but they were eliminated in the preliminary round with two draws and one loss. Muenster also were the first German side to win a game in that competition with a 3-1 victory over Estonian champions Betoon Tallinn in the 2008-09 season. Four-time German futsal champions Hamburg Panthers were the first German team to reach the Main Round in the 2013-14 season, where they lost all three group games, and the first side to advance to the Elite Round in the 2016-17 season to become one of the 16 best teams in Europe. TV Wackersdorf were the first German team to participate in the Mitropa Futsal Cup in the 2016-17 season, and finished in fourth place with one draw and two losses. In the course of time, Germany has climbed to 29th position in the UEFA coefficient rankings with now 2,084 points.

== Germany national futsal team ==
Germany
- Association: German Football Association
- Confederation: UEFA (Europe)
- FIFA code: GER
| Home colours | Away colours |

The German national futsal team represents the whole country. The German football association decided the foundation of a national team on 4 December 2015 within the context of a so-called Futsal Masterplan in order to participate in the qualification for the UEFA Futsal Euro 2018. Germany played their first international match at Hamburg's 2,092-capacity Inselpark on 30 October 2016 in a friendly against England, which ended in a 5-3 victory. Germany then played the qualification for the UEFA Futsal Euro 2018 but were eliminated in the preliminary round, finishing in third place in their qualifying group C with four points, above Estonia and behind group winners Latvia and Armenia.

== Futsal competitions ==
- Futsal Bundesliga
- DFB Futsal Cup
- UEFA Futsal Cup
- Mitropa Futsal Cup
- UEFA Futsal Championship
- FIFA Futsal World Cup
- Futsal Confederations Cup
