= Markus Giesecke =

German futsal player (born 1979)

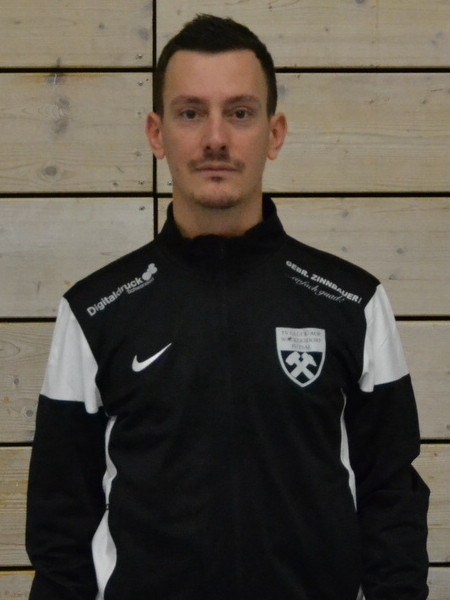
- Markus Giesecke (2016)

Personal information
- Date of birth: 15 April 1979 (age 47)
- Place of birth: Regensburg, West Germany
- Height: 1.70 m (5 ft 7 in)
- Positions: Midfielder; goalkeeper

Team information
- Current team: DJK Würmtal Futsal

Youth career
- Freier TuS Regensburg

Senior career*
| Years | Team | Apps | (Gls) |
| 2014–2016 | Futsal Club Regensburg | 13 | (4) |
| 2016–2017 | TV Wackersdorf | 14 | (2) |
| 2017–2018 | CD Internacional Intxaurrondo | 13 | (1) |
| 2018–2025 | Futsal Club Regensburg | 5 | (0) |
| 2025- | DJK Würmtal Futsal | 6 | (0) |
| Total | | 51 | (7) |

Managerial career
- 2018-2021: Futsal Club Regensburg
- * Club domestic league appearances and goals as of 8 November 2026 (UTC)

Markus Giesecke (born 15 April 1979) is a German futsal player from Regensburg, Germany who plays for DJK Würmtal Futsal, a futsal club based in the district of Munich, Germany.

== Club career ==
He started playing futsal in Spain and England and was signed by Futsal Club Regensburg in 2014 to play in the newly founded Futsal-Bayernliga, where he made his debut in Regensburg's 5-4 victory over SpVgg Bayreuth on matchday 3. In the winter break 2015/16 he was transferred to then first division side TV Wackersdorf. He came from the bench in Wackersdorf's 9-4 victory over Cosmos Hoechst on the last matchday and appeared in a total of 14 matches during his two-season spell with the Upper Palatinate club. He scored his first goal in the Futsal-Regionalliga on 8 October 2016 (matchday 4) in a 9-5 away loss to Germania Ober-Roden. During the off-season, he helped Wackersdorf to win their own international futsal tournament in Wackersdorf against German and Czech Republican top teams and the Portus Rothaus Cup in Pforzheim. In Wackersdorf's colours, he took part in the 2016 Mitropa Futsal Cup in Vienna where he played against the best sides from Central Europe. In April 2017, he moved to Segunda División B side CD Internacional Intxaurrondo to further develop his futsal skills and tactical knowledge. He made his debut in the Liga Gipuzkoana on the penultimate matchday of the 2016-17 season, in a 1-1 draw against Egarri Taberna on 8 April 2017. He played for the Basque side until May 2018 and was then resigned by Futsal Club Regensburg. In August 2019 he published a video on his YouTube channel showing him shooting and sinking fifteen consecutive balls in a five-hole goal wall. In 2025 he moved to newly founded Futsal-Bezirksliga side DJK Würmtal Futsal, where he made his debut on the first matchday of the 2025-26 season in a 7-3 away win over GBF München. At the end of the 2025-26 season, he finished in third place with the Würmtal team, which secured them promotion to the Futsal-Bayernliga.

== Minifootball ==
Markus Giesecke was called up to the Germany national minifootball team to participate in a training camp in Göttingen on 17 and 18 March 2017 in preparation for the 2017 EMF EURO.

== Headis ==
He participated in the Headis World Championship which took place in Kaiserslautern on 10 December 2022.

== Career statistics ==
As of 8 November 2026.

| Club | Season | League | | | Playoffs^{1} | | Cup^{2} | | Continental^{3} | | Total | | Ref. |
| Club | Season | League | Apps | Goals | Apps | Goals | Apps | Goals | Apps | Goals | Apps | Goals | Ref. |
|---|---|---|---|---|---|---|---|---|---|---|---|---|---|
| Futsal Club Regensburg | 2014/15 | Futsal-Bayernliga | 6 | 0 | 0 | 0 | 0 | 0 | 0 | 0 | 6 | 0 | |
| Futsal Club Regensburg | 2015/16 | Futsal-Bayernliga | 5 | 0 | 3 | 0 | 0 | 0 | 0 | 0 | 8 | 0 | |
| Futsal Club Regensburg | 2015/16 | Futsal-Bezirksliga | 2 | 4 | 0 | 0 | 0 | 0 | 0 | 0 | 2 | 4 | |
| Futsal Club Regensburg | Club totals | | 13 | 4 | 3 | 0 | 0 | 0 | 0 | 0 | 16 | 4 | — |
| TV Wackersdorf | 2015/16 | Futsal-Regionalliga Süd | 1 | 0 | 0 | 0 | 0 | 0 | 0 | 0 | 1 | 0 | |
| TV Wackersdorf | 2016/17 | Futsal-Regionalliga Süd | 13 | 2 | 0 | 0 | 0 | 0 | 3 | 0 | 16 | 2 | |
| TV Wackersdorf | Club totals | | 14 | 2 | 0 | 0 | 0 | 0 | 3 | 0 | 17 | 2 | — |
| CD Internacional Intxaurrondo | 2016/17 | Liga Gipuzkoana | 2 | 0 | 0 | 0 | 0 | 0 | 0 | 0 | 2 | 0 | |
| CD Internacional Intxaurrondo | 2017/18 | Liga Gipuzkoana | 11 | 1 | 0 | 0 | 3 | 0 | 0 | 0 | 14 | 1 | |
| CD Internacional Intxaurrondo | Club totals | | 13 | 1 | 0 | 0 | 3 | 0 | 0 | 0 | 16 | 1 | — |
| Futsal Club Regensburg | 2018/19 | Futsal-Bayernliga | 5 | 0 | 0 | 0 | 0 | 0 | 0 | 0 | 5 | 0 | |
| Futsal Club Regensburg | 2019/20 | Futsal-Bayernliga | 0 | 0 | 0 | 0 | 0 | 0 | 0 | 0 | 0 | 0 | |
| Futsal Club Regensburg | 2020/21 | Futsal-Bayernliga | 0 | 0 | 0 | 0 | 0 | 0 | 0 | 0 | 0 | 0 | |
| Futsal Club Regensburg | Club totals | | 5 | 0 | 0 | 0 | 0 | 0 | 0 | 0 | 5 | 0 | — |
| DJK Würmtal Futsal | 2025/26 | Futsal-Bezirksliga | 5 | 0 | 0 | 0 | 0 | 0 | 0 | 0 | 5 | 0 | |
| DJK Würmtal Futsal | 2026/27 | Futsal-Bayernliga | 1 | 0 | 0 | 0 | 0 | 0 | 0 | 0 | 1 | 0 | |
| DJK Würmtal Futsal | Club totals | | 6 | 0 | 0 | 0 | 0 | 0 | 0 | 0 | 6 | 0 | — |
| Career totals | | | 51 | 7 | 3 | 0 | 3 | 0 | 3 | 0 | 60 | 7 | — |

- 1.Includes promotion and relegation playoff matches.
- 2.Includes BFV, SFV and DFB futsal cup competitions.
- 3.Includes UEFA Futsal Cup and Mitropa Futsal Cup.

== Honours ==
3rd - Futsal Regionalliga Süd 2016
1st - International Wackersdorf Cup 2016
1st - Portus Rothaus Cup 2016 in Pforzheim
4th - Mitropa Futsal Cup 2016 in Vienna
