= NAFI Stuttgart =

- Full name: NAFI Stuttgart e.V.
- Short name: NAFI Stuttgart
- Founded: 1989 (as Hilalspor Stuttgart)
- Ground: Stuttgart, Baden-Württemberg

NAFI Stuttgart (stylized as N.A.F.I. Stuttgart) is a German futsal and football club from Stuttgart. The futsal team won the DFB-Futsal-Cup, the German futsal championship, once. As of September 2022, the club is currently not fielding any teams.

== History ==
The club originated from an amateur team that was founded around 2005. Five years later, the team joined the Türk SC Stuttgart. After this club dissolved, the team continued to play as Hilalspor Stuttgart. In 2013, the club was renamed to NAFI Stuttgart. As the Württemberg Football Association believed that NAFI was a family name and therefore not allowed as a club name, periods were inserted between the letters. According to the club president, NAFI stands for Neuer Amateurfußball international (Neuer international amateur football). However, the club's website states that the name derives from the sponsor Nafis Bakirci.

=== Futsal ===
Under the name TSC Stuttgart, the team first qualified for the DFB-Futsal-Cup in 2008 and became German futsal vice champions after a 3:6 defeat in the final against UFC Münster. After being eliminated prematurely in 2009, 2012 and 2013, the club won the German championship in 2014. After defeating Hamburg Panthers and UFC Münster, the Stuttgart team reached the final again, where they beat Holzpfosten Schwerte 5:3. The following year, Schwerte took revenge with a 10:4 victory in the semifinals. For unknown reasons, Stuttgart did not participate in the newly introduced Regionalliga Süd in 2015 and instead played in the second division.

=== Football ===
NAFI Stuttgart was also active in football. The first team was promoted to the Bezirksliga Stuttgart in 2015 and to the Landesliga in 2017. At the winter break of the 2018/19 season, NAFI was in second place in the Landesliga, but due to unpaid wages and internal disputes within the club, the team only finished eleventh in the table at the end of the season. For the 2019/20 season, the club did not register a team and was therefore placed last in the final Landesliga table of the 2018/19 season.

== Honours ==
- DFB-Futsal-Cup winner: 2014
