= Futsal Club Regensburg =

German futsal club

- Full name: Futsal Club Regensburg
- Founded: 2011; 15 years ago
- Ground: Regensburg
- Capacity: 1,500
- Owner: Martin Diermayr
- League: Futsal-Bayernliga
- 2025–26: 1st
| Home colours | Away colours |

Futsal Club Regensburg (FCR) is a German futsal club based in Regensburg. The first team currently plays in the Futsal-Bayernliga, which is the third tier of futsal in the German futsal league system.

== Club history ==
FCR is renowned for being a pioneer for the development of futsal in Germany and has arranged many futsal courses. Founded in 2011, it is the oldest futsal club in Bavaria and a founding member of the first Bavarian Futsal League. The club started as a university team and reached the final of the 2013 German Futsal University Championships, where they lost 9-3 to former DFB Futsal Cup winners Muenster. In the 2015-16 Bayernliga season, FCR qualified for the promotion playoffs to the Futsal-Regionalliga Süd, but were eliminated in a two-legged semi-final encounter by eventual winners SSV Jahn Regensburg. The first team was dissolved at the end of the 2015–16 season after many players had left the club to nearby rivals SSV Jahn Regensburg and TV Wackersdorf. The club restarted in the Futsal-Bezirksliga for the 2016-17 season and finished first in their division to qualify for the division playoff final, where they were beaten by SV Schwarzhofen. They returned to the Futsal-Bayernliga for the 2018-19 season and managed to manoeuvre to 7th place to avoid relegation. In the following seasons they improved their rankings, finishing 3rd in the 2023-24 season and 2nd in the 2024-25 season. In 2024, they won the Bavarian Futsal Cup after securing a narrow 1-0 win over eventual Futsal-Bundesliga side YB Balkan Pfarrkirchen.

== Honours ==
- German Futsal University Championships:
  - Runners-up (1): 2013
- Promotion playoffs to the Futsal-Regionalliga Süd:
  - Semi-final: 2016
- Bavarian Futsal Cup:
  - winners (1): 2024
