= Neuer =

Neuer may refer to:

- Neuer (surname)

== Organizations ==
- Neuer Botanischer Garten der Universität Göttingen, Göttingen
- Neuer Botanischer Garten Marburg, Marburg
- Neuer Botanischer Garten Tübingen, Tübingen

== Places ==
- Neuer Dom, Linz Cathedral, Austria
- Borkum Neuer Light, a German lighthouse
- Neuer Marstall, a historic building in Berlin, Germany

== Music and entertainment ==
- Neuer Deutscher Film (or JDF, "Junger Deutscher Film"), a period in German cinema
- Ein neuer Tag ("A new day"), the second studio album by German pop/rock band Juli

== See also ==
- Neuner (disambiguation)
- Neumann (disambiguation)
