= Futsal-Bayernliga =

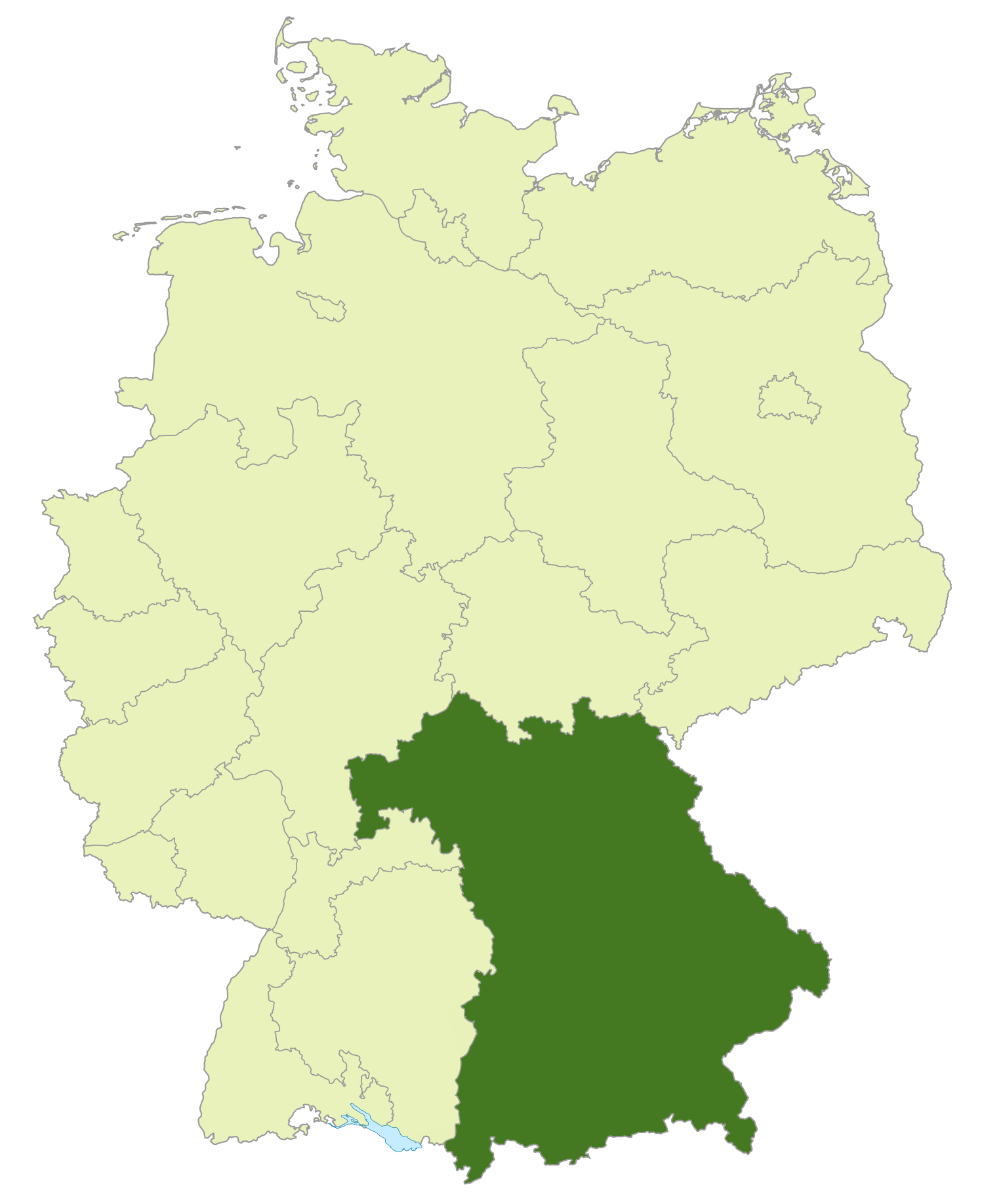
- Organising body: Bavarian Football Association
- Founded: 2014
- Country: Germany
- State: Bavaria
- Confederation: UEFA
- Number of clubs: 8
- Level on pyramid: 2
- Promotion to: Futsal-Regionalliga Süd
- Relegation to: Futsal-Bezirksliga
- Current champions: FC Deisenhofen (1st title) (2016–17)
- Most championships: TV Wackersdorf, SSV Jahn Regensburg, FC Deisenhofen (1 title)
- Top scorer: (Germany) Luca Piga (30)
- Website: www.bfv.de
- Current: 2017–18 Futsal-Bayernliga

The Futsal-Bayernliga (English: Bavarian Futsal League) is the highest futsal league in the state of Bavaria (German: Bayern) and the second tier of futsal under the Futsal-Regionalliga Süd and above the Futsal-Bezirksliga in the German futsal league system.

== Regulations of the Futsal-Bayernliga ==
The Futsal-Bayernliga was introduced in the 2014-2015 season with five teams and TV Wackersdorf were crowned the first champions. The league champion earns a playoff spot for promotion to the Futsal-Regionalliga Süd. The bottom teams are relegated directly or compete in a relegation playoff round. The Futsal-Bayernliga is organised by the Bavarian Football Association.

The Futsal-Bayernliga is played in a double round-robin format, with each team playing each other twice, once at home and once away. If the number of teams exceeds seven, the league can be divided into a northern and a southern division. If the league is divided into two groups, the best two teams of each group will compete in a Final Four Tournament to determine the league champion.

== Founding members of the Futsal-Bayernliga 2014/15 ==
In order of finish:

TV Wackersdorf, BaKi Futsal Nuremberg, TSV Neuried, Futsal Club Regensburg, SpVgg Bayreuth

== Champions of the Futsal-Bayernliga ==
Year	Champions	Runners-up	Third place	Fourth place
2015	TV Wackersdorf	BaKi Futsal Nuremberg	TSV Neuried	Futsal Club Regensburg
2016	SSV Jahn Regensburg	USC Bayreuth	TSV Neuried	Futsal Club Regensburg
2017	FC Deisenhofen	FC Croatia Munich	TSV 1860 Munich	SSV Jahn Regensburg B
2018				

(bold teams = Promotion to Futsal-Regionalliga Süd)

== Records ==
=== Player records ===
As of 2 September 2017

Johannes Ebert (Futsal Club and Jahn Regensburg) and Sven Hausmann (TSV Neuried) are the league's record players with 16 caps each. The top goalscorer is Luca Piga (SpVgg Bayreuth and USC Bayreuth) with 30 goals.

=== Team records ===
As of 2 September 2017

TV Wackersdorf were crowned the first champions. The most league titles (1) have been won by TV Wackersdorf, SSV Jahn Regensburg and FC Deisenhofen. The most wins (10) have been recorded by FC Deisenhofen. FC Deisenhofen have won all of their games and they are the league's only unbeaten team. The most losses (12) have been recorded by TSV Neuried. Up until now, all of the league champions have achieved promotion to the Futsal-Regionalliga.

== See also ==
- DFB Futsal Cup
- Futsal-Regionalliga
- Futsal-Regionalliga Süd
- Futsal
