= Hassan Oumari =

Association football player and coach (born 1986)

Personal information
- Full name: Hassan Noureddine Oumari
- Date of birth: 11 August 1986 (age 40)
- Place of birth: Berlin, Germany
- Height: 1.79 m (5 ft 10 in)
- Positions: Left-back; left winger

Team information
- Current team: BSV Dersim 1993 (player-coach)

Senior career*
Years	Team	Apps	(Gls)
2005–2008	Reinickendorfer Füchse		
2008–2009	SV Babelsberg 03	3	(0)
2008–2009	SV Babelsberg 03 II	14	(0)
2009–2010	Berliner FC Dynamo	19	(0)
2010–2011	Brandenburger SC Süd 05	3	(0)
2011	Safa		(1)
2011–2012	FC Viktoria 1889 Berlin	22	(1)
2012–2013	RSV Waltersdorf 09	10	(0)
2013	Torgelower FC Greif	1	(0)
2013	Tripoli	6	(0)
2013–2014	1. FC Novi Pazar 95	16	(9)
2014–2015	FSV Optik Rathenow	12	(0)
2015–2016	Nejmeh	20	(0)
2016–2017	1. FC Novi Pazar 95	7	(3)
2017	Nejmeh	8	(0)
2017–2018	CFC Hertha 06 (futsal)	6	(8)
2018	FV Preussen Eberswalde	10	(2)
2018–2019	1. FC Novi Pazar 95	13	(0)
2018	1894 Berlin (futsal)	2	(0)
2019	Safa	10	(0)
2019–2020	FC Liria Berlin	14	(5)
2019	FC Liria Berlin (futsal)	1	(1)
2020–2022	CFC Hertha 06	24	(5)
2022–2023	Hertha BSC III	3	(1)
2023–2024	SV Falkensee-Finkenkrug	23	(5)
2024–2025	Spandauer SV	8	(8)
2025–	BSV Dersim 1993	3	(2)

International career
2016	Lebanon	2	(0)

Managerial career
- 2016: 1. FC Novi Pazar 95
- 2022–2023: CFC Hertha 06 (assistant)
- 2024–: Spandauer SV
- * Club domestic league appearances and goals as of 12:36, 11 August 2026 (UTC)

Hassan Noureddine Oumari (Arabic: حسن نور الدين العمري; born 11 August 1986) is a football player, coach and futsal player who plays as a left-back or left winger. He is the player-coach of German club BSV Dersim 1993. Born in Germany, he played for the Lebanon national team in 2016.

== Personal life ==
Oumari was born on 11 August 1986 in Berlin, Germany, to Lebanese Kurds from Beirut. Oumari's parents emigrated from Lebanon to Germany in 1980 due to the Lebanese Civil War. He has two brothers, Ahmed and Joan; the latter also played football.

== Club career ==
In June 2008, Hassan and his younger brother Joan moved from Reinickendorfer Füchse to Regionalliga side SV Babelsberg 03.

In 2013, Oumari signed for Lebanese Premier League side Tripoli. He played for Nejmeh during the 2015–16 season. After a brief period in Germany, Oumari re-joined Nejmeh in 2017. In December 2018, Oumari joined Safa in Lebanon.

Oumari joined SV Falkensee-Finkenkrug in summer 2023.

== International career ==
Oumari was first called up to the Lebanon national team in November 2014, alongside his brother Joan, for a friendly game against Macedonia. He made his international debut on 5 February 2025, as a substitute in a 2–0 defeat to Bahrain.

== Style of play ==
Oumari can play as a left-back or left winger.

== Honours ==
Reinickendorfer Füchse

- Berlin-Liga: 2007–08

Berliner FC Dynamo

- NOFV-Oberliga Nord runner-up: 2009–10
- Berlin Cup runner-up: 2009–10

Safa

- Lebanese FA Cup runner-up: 2010–11

Tripoli

- Lebanese FA Cup runner-up: 2013–14

1. FC Novi Pazar 95

- Kreisliga A Berlin runner-up: 2013–14

FSV Optik Rathenow

- NOFV-Oberliga Nord: 2014–15

Nejmeh

- Lebanese FA Cup: 2015–16; runner-up: 2017–18
- Lebanese Elite Cup: 2017

== See also ==
- List of Lebanon international footballers born outside Lebanon
- List of association football families
