= Stuttgarter FC =

German futsal club

- Full name: Stuttgarter Futsal Club
- Founded: 2020
- Ground: Scharrena Stuttgart
- Capacity: 2,019
- Manager: Vojkan Vukmirovic
- League: Futsal Bundesliga
- 2021: 1st, Champions

Stuttgarer FC is a German futsal club from Stuttgart, Baden-Württemberg currently competing in the Futsal Bundesliga, the highest division of futsal in Germany.

== History ==
Stuttgarter FC was the inaugural champions of the Futsal Bundesliga in 2021. With the championship, the club qualified for the 2022–23 UEFA Futsal Champions League.

== International competition ==
Scores and results list Stuttgart's goal tally first.

Competition	Round	Country	Opponent	Home	Away	Aggregate
2022–23 UEFA Futsal Champions League	Preliminary round	Turkey	Istanbul Şişli	N/A	4–2	N/A
2022–23 UEFA Futsal Champions League	Preliminary round	Georgia	Georgians Tbilisi	N/A	2–4	N/A
2022–23 UEFA Futsal Champions League	Preliminary round	Sweden	Örebro	N/A	1–2	N/A
