= 1. FC Schwandorf =

German football club

- Full name: 1. Fussball Club Schwandorf e.V. Eisenbahner Sportverein
- Founded: 20 December 1913
- Ground: Hindenburgkampfbahn
- Capacity: 3,000
- Chairman: Reinhard Mieschala
- Manager: Robert Arnold
- League: A-Klasse (X)
- 2015–16: Kreisklasse Cham-Schwandorf West (IX), 13th ↓

The 1. FC Schwandorf is a German association football club from the town of Schwandorf, Bavaria.

The club's most successful era was in the late 1950s and 1960s when it spent thirteen season in the tier three Bayernliga. The club has a strong association with the German railways, as evident by the term railway sports club in its name (German: Eisenbahner Sportverein), and is a member of the Association of German railway sports clubs, the VDES.

== History ==
1. FC Schwandorf was formed on 20 December 1913. In the years up to the Second World War the club's history was strongly intertwined with another local club, TV Schwandorf, which it often cooperated with, and the Deutsche Reichsbahn, the German state railway. The later lead to the club carrying the term Reichsbahn in its name for the most part during that time, a tradition continuing today with the club still having the German word for railway, Eisenbahn, in its name. The later connection however proved an obstacle after the war with the allied occupation authorities initially not allowing clubs with a pre-war government connection to reestablish themselves.

The club earned promotion to the southern division of the Bayernliga in 1956 after a title in the 2. Amateurliga Oberpfalz, followed by a first place in the subsequent promotion round, with second place and another promotion spot going to FC Bayern Munich Amateure.

Schwandorf spend the next thirteen seasons in the Bayernliga, the first seven in the southern division of the league. In this era, from 1956 to 1963, the club finished in the top ten each season with a fourth place in 1958–59 as its best result. In 1962–63 1. FC came seventh, the lowest possible finish to still qualify for the now unified Bayernliga. Schwandorf spend another six seasons at this level with a ninth place in its first season there as its best result. The club gradually declined until 1969 when an eighteenth-place finish meant relegation from the league.

Schwandorf became part of the Landesliga Bayern-Mitte for the next five seasons after 1969. Initially the club was a strong side in the league, finishing third in 1971 as its best result but not achieving promotion to the Bayernliga again. By 1974 however the club dropped out of this level, too, after finishing sixteenth in the league. After three seasons in the Bezirksliga Schwandorf made a return to the Landesliga in 1977 and played another three seasons there. A third-place finish in 1979 equalled the club's best result in the league but the season after another relegation followed with 1. FC not returning to this level for the next fifteen years.

In 1988 the club became part of the newly introduced Bezirksoberliga Oberpfalz, the new highest football league in the Upper Palatinate. It dropped out of this league for a season in 1992–93 but returned immediately. Two seasons later, in 1995, it won the league and made a brief return to the Landesliga. Schwandorf played two more seasons at this level but an eighteenth place in 1997 meant another relegation. The season after, in the Bezirksoberliga, the club was unsuccessful, too, and relegated again.

The club bounced back immediately in 1999 and returned to the Bezirksoberliga for another seven seasons. The first six of those were quite successful with a second-place finish in 2002 as its best result but, in 2006, the club came fourteenth and was relegated yet again. Schwandorf made a permanent exit from the Bezirksoberliga, unable to return to this level until the league was disbanded in 2012. The 2002–03 season also saw the demise of the club's strongest local rival, the FC Linde Schwandorf, a club that climbed as high as the Landesliga but experienced financial difficulties in late 2002 and had to fold.

The club took out the Upper Palatinate Cup in 2008 which in turn qualified it for the first round of the Bavarian Cup, where it was knocked out by eventual winners SpVgg Unterhaching. Since relegation from the Bezirksoberliga the club has been fluctuating between the Bezirksliga and the Kreisliga below until 2015, when it was relegated to the Kreisklasse. Another relegation followed in 2015–16, now to the A-Klasse.

== Stadium ==
The club plays its home games at the Hindenburgkampfbahn, which was opened in 1930 and holds up to 6,000 spectators.

== Honours ==
The club's honours:

=== League ===
- 2. Amateurliga Oberpfalz
  - Champions: 1956
- Bezirksoberliga Oberpfalz
  - Champions: 1995
  - Runners-up: 2002
- Bezirksliga Oberpfalz
  - Champions: 1993
  - Runners-up: 1977, 1999
- Kreisliga Oberpfalz-West
  - Champions: 2012

=== Cup ===
- Oberpfalz Cup
  - Winners: 2008

== Recent seasons ==
The recent season-by-season performance of the club:

Season	Division	Tier	Position
1999–2000	Bezirksoberliga Oberpfalz	VI	5th
2000–01	Bezirksoberliga Oberpfalz	VI	3rd
2001–02	Bezirksoberliga Oberpfalz	VI	2nd
2002–03	Bezirksoberliga Oberpfalz	VI	4th
2003–04	Bezirksoberliga Oberpfalz	VI	8th
2004–05	Bezirksoberliga Oberpfalz	VI	6th
2005–06	Bezirksoberliga Oberpfalz	VI	14th ↓
2006–07	Bezirksliga Oberpflaz-Süd	VII	6th
2007–08	Bezirksliga Oberpflaz-Süd	VII	5th
2008–09	Bezirksliga Oberpflaz-Süd	VIII	4th
2009–10	Bezirksliga Oberpflaz-Süd	VIII	8th
2010–11	Bezirksliga Oberfalz-Nord	VIII	13th ↓
2011–12	Kreisliga Oberpfalz-West	IX	1st ↑
2012–13	Bezirksliga Oberfalz-Nord	VII	16th ↓
2013–14	Kreisliga Oberpfalz-West	VIII	6th
2014–15	Kreisliga Oberpfalz-West	VIII	15th ↓
2015–16	Kreisklasse Cham-Schwandorf West	IX	13th ↓
2016–17	A-Klasse	X	

- With the introduction of the Bezirksoberligas in 1988 as the new fifth tier, below the Landesligas, all leagues below dropped one tier. With the introduction of the Regionalligas in 1994 and the 3. Liga in 2008 as the new third tier, below the 2. Bundesliga, all leagues below dropped one tier. With the establishment of the Regionalliga Bayern as the new fourth tier in Bavaria in 2012 the Bayernliga was split into a northern and a southern division, the number of Landesligas expanded from three to five and the Bezirksoberligas abolished. All leagues from the Bezirksligas onwards were elevated one tier.

=== Key ===
↑ Promoted	↓ Relegated
