= Nemzeti Bajnokság I (disambiguation) =

Nemzeti Bajnokság I may refer to:

- Nemzeti Bajnokság I, top tier association football in Hungary
- Nemzeti Bajnokság I (rugby union)
- Nemzeti Bajnokság I (men's handball)
- Nemzeti Bajnokság I (women's handball)
- Nemzeti Bajnokság I (men's futsal)
