= Anton Manolov =

Bulgarian sports shooter

Personal information
- Born: 15 January 1937 (age 89) Kazichene, Kingdom of Bulgaria

Sport
- Sport: Sports shooting

Anton Manolov (Bulgarian: Антон Манолов, born 15 January 1937) is a Bulgarian former sports shooter. He competed at five Olympic games between 1968 and 1992.

== See also ==
- List of athletes with the most appearances at Olympic Games
