= Miloš Ivić =

Serbian footballer

Personal information
- Full name: Miloš Ivić
- Date of birth: 22 April 1985 (age 41)
- Place of birth: Jagodina, SFR Yugoslavia
- Height: 1.91 m (6 ft 3 in)
- Position: Centre forward

Team information
- Current team: TV Wackersdorf

Senior career*
Years	Team	Apps	(Gls)
2003–2005	→ Mladi Obilić (loan)	56	(8)
2005–2007	Železničar Beograd	69	(10)
2008	Pobeda Prilep	0	(0)
2009	Balkan Rosengard	19	(9)
2010–2013	Tabane Trgovački	69	(28)
2014	Asteras Magoula	6	(0)
2014–2017	Tabane Trgovački		
2017–	TV Wackersdorf	3	(3)
- * Club domestic league appearances and goals as of 7 November 2014

Miloš Ivić (Serbian Cyrillic: Милош Ивић; born 22 April 1985) is a Serbian football forward who plays for TV Wackersdorf in Futsal-Regionalliga Süd.
