= Bezirksoberliga Oberpfalz =

- Founded: 1988
- Folded: 2012
- Country: Germany
- State: Bavaria
- Level on pyramid: Level 7
- Promotion to: Landesliga Mitte
- Relegation to: Bezirksliga Nord; Bezirksliga Süd
- Last champions: FC Amberg (2011–12)

The Bezirksoberliga Oberpfalz was the seventh tier of the German football league system in the Bavarian Regierungsbezirk of Upper Palatinate (German: Oberpfalz). Until the introduction of the 3. Liga in 2008 it was the sixth tier of the league system, until the introduction of the Regionalligas in 1994 the fifth tier.

The league was disbanded at the end of the 2011–12 season, when major changes to the Bavarian football league system were carried out. Above the Bezirksoberligas, the Landesligas were expanded in number from three to five divisions and the Bezirke have two to three regional leagues, the Bezirksligas, as its highest level again, similar to the system in place until 1988.

== Overview ==
The Bezirksoberligas in Bavaria were introduced in 1988 to create a highest single-division playing level for each of the seven Bezirke.

Before the introduction of the Bezirksoberligas, the Bezirksliga was the level of play below the Landesliga. The Bezirksliga Oberpfalz-Nord and Oberpfalz-Süd fed the Landesliga Bayern-Mitte as they afterwards fed the Bezirksoberliga Oberpfalz.

The winner of the Bezirksoberliga Oberpfalz, like the winner of the Bezirksoberliga Niederbayern and Bezirksoberliga Mittelfranken, was directly promoted to the Landesliga Bayern-Mitte. The second placed teams out of those leagues played-off for another promotion spot with the 15th placed team out of the Landesliga for the last spot there. However, in some years additional promotion places were available in the Landesliga.

The three bottom teams of the Bezirksoberliga were relegated to the Bezirksliga, the team just above those faced a play-off against the second placed Bezirksliga teams.

With the league reform at the end of the 2011–12 season, which includes an expansion of the number of Landesligas from three to five, the Bezirksoberligas were disbanded. Instead, the Bezirksligas took the place of the Bezirksoberligas below the Landesligas once more.

The clubs from the Bezirksoberliga joined the following leagues:

- Champions : Promotion round to the Bayernliga, winners to the Bayernliga, losers to the Landesliga.
- Teams placed 2nd to 6th: Directly qualified to the Landesliga.
- Team placed 7th : Two additional Landesliga places to be determined in a play-off round with the Bezirksliga champions, losers enter Bezirksliga.
- Teams placed 8th to 19th: Directly relegated to Bezirksliga.

== Winners and runners-up ==
The following teams have won or finished runners-up in the league:

**Season**	**Champions**	**Runners-up**
1988–89	**TSV Detag Wernberg**	ASV Cham ^{+}
1989–90	**TSV Kareth-Lappersdorf**	Fortuna Regensburg
1990–91	**ASV Cham**	**TSV Detag Wernberg**
1991–92	**VfB Regensburg**	TSV Kareth-Lappersdorf ^{+}
1992–93	**FC Furth im Wald**	TS Regensburg
1993–94	**FC Linde Schwandorf**	VfB Regensburg
1994–95	**1. FC Schwandorf**	DJK Ensdorf
1995–96	**SC Luhe-Wildenau**	SSV Schönhofen
1996–97	**SV Neusorg**	**Freier TuS Regensburg**
1997–98	**FC Linde Schwandorf**	TV Wackersdorf
1998–99	**SC Luhe-Wildenau** ^{+}	**TV Wackersdorf** ^{+}
1999–2000	**DJK Vilzing**	TSV Detag Wernberg
2000–01	**SV Neusorg**	SV Detag Weiden ^{+}
2001–02	**FC Beilngries**	1. FC Schwandorf
2002–03	**FC Amberg**	**TSV Kareth-Lappersdorf**
2003–04	**FC Tegernheim**	SV Etzenricht
2004–05	**FC Amberg**	Fortuna Regensburg
2005–06	**SV Etzenricht**	Fortuna Regensburg ^{+}
2006–07	**DJK Vilzing**	DJK Ammerthal ^{+}
2007–08	**FC Tegernheim**	DJK Ammerthal ^{+}
2008–09	**DJK Ammerthal** ^{+}	**SpVgg Weiden II** ^{+}
2009–10	**TSV Bad Abbach**	ASV Cham
2010–11	**ASV Cham**	SV Sorghof
2011–12	**FC Amberg**	**FC Tegernheim**

- Promoted teams in **bold**.
- ^{+} Teams finished on equal points, decider needed to determine final position.

=== Multiple winners ===
The following clubs have won the league more than once:

**Club**	**Wins**	**Years**
FC Amberg	3	2003, 2005, 2012
ASV Cham	2	1991, 2011
FC Tegernheim	2	2004, 2008
DJK Vilzing	2	2000, 2007
SV Neusorg	2	1997, 2001
SC Luhe-Wildenau	2	1996, 1999
FC Linde Schwandorf	2	1994, 1998

== League placings ==
The final placings in the league since its interception:

Club	S	89	90	91	92	93	94	95	96	97	98	99	00	01	02	03	04	05	06	07	08	09	10	11	12
Freier TuS Regensburg	6	16				9	6	4	9	2	L	L	L	L	L	L	L	L	L	L	L	L	L	B	L
SV Etzenricht	7												7	13	10	3	2	3	1	L	L	L	L	L	L
DJK Ammerthal	9										13				4	8	4	12	4	2	2	1	L	L	L
TSV Bad Abach	3																				3	3	1	L	L
ASV Cham	6	2	4	1	L	L	L	L	L	L	L	L	L	L	L	L	L	L	L	L	L	6	2	1	L
FC Amberg ^{2}	3															1	L	1	L	L	L	L	L	L	1
FC Tegernheim	15						4	13	8	9	7	13	12	4	3	7	1	L	8	6	1	L	L	L	2
SpVgg Weiden ^{1}	1	B	B	B	B	B	L	L	B	B	B	B	B	B	B	B	B	B	L	B	B	B	R	R	3
DJK Vilzing	4											4	1	L	L	L	L	L	L	1	L	L	L	L	4
TSV Kareth-Lappersdorf	20	L	1	L	2	5	14		3	8	8	3	8	8	5	2	L	8	3	13	8	12	11	12	5
VfB Bach	12									6	12	6	9	14		14				7	5	4	5	4	6
Fortuna Regensburg	17		2	13	6	7	8	8	11	15					6	6	3	2	2	16		15		3	7
1. FC Beilngries	15									7	3	10	3	6	1	L	6	5	7	3	4	7	4	7	8
SC Ettmannsdorf	4																	13					9	5	9
SC Regensburg	7										14		14		8	13							12	9	10
FV Vilseck	1																								11
SV Sorghof	5																				7	9	13	2	12
TB/ASV Regenstauf ^{4}	1																								13
ASV Burglengenfeld	6																15				12	8	6	8	14
SV Kulmain	6																			11	6	10	3	13	15
SSV Paulsdorf	2																							11	16
TSV Detag Wernberg	14	1	L	2	L	8	15				11	8	2	11	9	10	7	15						6	17
SpVgg Hainsacker	2																							10	18
SV Raigering	6	10	5	15		14															15				19
SpVgg Weiden II ^{1}	1																					2	L	L	
FC Ränkam	11								12	10	6	9	4	7	13	11	14						10	14	
FC Furth im Wald	12	12	11	3	13	1	L	11	14										9	14		5	7	15	
SV Plößberg	4																			8	14		8	16	
SC Luhe-Wildenau	10								1	L	L	1	L	L	L	5	5	4	6	4	11	13	14		
1. FC Schwarzenfeld	5																		11	9	10	11	15		
FC Edelsfeld	1																						16		
FC Thalmassing	1																					14			
SpVgg Pirk	5																10	11	5	10	9				
SSV Paulsdorf	3																		12	5	13				
SV Detag Weiden	9												6	2	7	12	13	9	13	12	16				
DJK-SV Lengenfeld	6											11	13	12	15				10	15					
1. FC Schwandorf	14	9	10	12	15		3	1	L	L	15		5	3	2	4	8	6	14						
SV Schwarzhofen	2																	7	15						
1. FC Rötz	3																9	10	16						
TSV Dietfurt	2																11	14							
SpVgg Schirmitz	1																	16							
SV Neusorg	4									1	L	L	L	1	L	L	12	17							
TV Wackersdorf	5									4	2	2	L	L	11	9									
TB Roding	1															15									
TSV Eslarn	3													5	12	16									
FC Linde Schwandorf ^{3}	6			4	3	10	1	L	L	3	1	L	L	L	L										
SSV Schönhofen	8				10	12	9	9	2	14				10	14										
FC Dalking	2													9	16										
1. FC Wernberg	3											5	10	15											
DJK Ensdorf	11	8	6	16			7	2	10	12	5	12	11	16											
DJK-SV Keilberg	3										4	7	15												
TSV Nittenau	1												16												
TSV Wacker Neutraubling	7					13	5	5	6	13	9	14													
SpVgg Vohenstrauß	5	14							5	5	10	15													
TSV Erbendorf	3				11	16						16													
FC Maxhütte Haidhof	4							12	7	11	16														
TSV Pressath	8	L	12	5	5	3	13	6	4	16															
1. FC Rieden	5				7	11	12	7	13																
TB Regenstauf ^{4}	8	6	9	7	9	4	11	10	15																
VfB Regensburg	5		7	10	1	L	2	3																	
ASV Neustadt	7	3	3	6	4	6	10	14																	
DJK Seugast	1							15																	
FSV Waldthurn	1							16																	
TS Regensburg	4			9	8	2	16																		
SpVgg Pfreimd	2				12	15																			
SV Zeitlarn	4	4	8	8	14																				
SG Hohenschambach	2			11	16																				
SV Kemnath	2		13	15																					
SC Teublitz	2	11	14																						
TuS Grafenwöhr	2	7	15																						
DJK Dürnsicht	2	5	16																						
SpVgg Windischeschenbach	1	13																							
SV Sünching	1	15																							

=== Key ===
Color	Key
R	Regionalliga Süd
B	Bayernliga
L	Landesliga Mitte
1, 2, 3, ...	Bezirksoberliga
1	League champions
	Played at a league level below this league

- S = No of seasons in league (as of 2011-12)

=== Notes ===
- ^{1} In 2011, SpVgg Weiden declared insolvency in the Regionalliga and was relegated to the Bezirksoberliga Oberpfalz, taking the place of its reserve side.
- ^{2} In 1995, 1. FC Amberg was declared bankrupt and folded. A new club, the FC Amberg, was formed, initially within the TV Amberg.
- ^{3} The FC Linde Schwandorf folded in 2002 and reformed as FT Eintracht Schwandorf.
- ^{4} In 2008, the TB Regenstauf merged with ASV Regenstauf to form TB/ASV Regenstauf.
