= FC Liria Berlin =

German futsal club

- Founded: 1985; 41 years ago
- Ground: Berlin, Germany
- Manager: (Germany) Petr Schatalin
- League: DFB Futsal Bundesliga
- 2024-25: 6th

FC Liria Berlin is a German futsal team from Berlin which competes in the Futsal Bundesliga.

== History ==
The club was founded in 1985 by Kosovo Albanian immigrants living in Berlin. The first football team competed in the Bezirksliga from 2006 to 2012 and has played at that level again since 2013.

Greater success has been achieved by FC Liria’s futsal team. In 2015, the club finished as runners-up in the northeastern German championship behind VfL 05 Hohenstein-Ernstthal. One year later, the Berlin side again finished as runners-up in what was now called the Regionalliga Nordost, the highest division in northeastern Germany, and—following a rule change—qualified for the Deutsche Futsal-Meisterschaft 2016.

On their way to the final, FC Liria defeated FC Portus Pforzheim, TuS Kirchberg and TSV Weilimdorf. In the final, they faced defending champions and record title holders Hamburg Panthers away from home and lost 2–4.

The following year, FC Liria again qualified for the Deutsche Futsal-Meisterschaft 2017, but were eliminated in the preliminary round by SV Pars Neu-Isenburg.

=== Bundesliga (since 2023) ===
As champions of the NOFV-Futsal-Liga (Regionalliga Nordost), FC Liria qualified for the promotion play-offs to the Futsal-Bundesliga. The club prevailed against Futsal Panthers Köln and Harburger SC to secure promotion. Liria thus became the second Berlin club to compete in the Futsal-Bundesliga after 1894 Berlin.

== Honours ==
- Deutsche Futsal-Meisterschaft: Vice-champion 2016
