= Mitropa Futsal Cup =

- Sport: Futsal
- Founded: 2009
- No. of teams: Various
- Countries: Central European teams
- Most recent champion: (Hungary) ETO Futsal Club Györ (4th title)
- Most titles: (Czech Republic) Futsal Klub Era-Pack Chrudim (5 titles)
- Website: http://mitropafutsalcup.eu/

The Mitropa Futsal Cup is an annual futsal competition and considered one of the most important European futsal tournaments. It is a preparation tournament for the UEFA Futsal Cup and takes place every year at a different venue in Central Europe. The name derives from the famous Mitropa Cup football competition, which was played between 1927 and 1992. The Mitropa Futsal Cup has been played since 2009 and features the best teams as well as national futsal champions from Austria, Hungary, Slovenia, Slovakia, Croatia, Serbia, Germany, Poland and the Czech Republic.

The most successful club is Futsal Klub Era-Pack Chrudim with 5 titles.

== Mitropa Futsal Cup winners ==
Season	Champion	Score	Runner-up	Third place	Score	Fourth place
2009-10	(Czech Republic) Futsal Klub Era-Pack Chrudim	8–1	(Hungary) Colorspectrum Aramis Budapest	(Slovakia) RCS Košice	6–4	(Austria) Stella Rossa Wien
2010-11	(Czech Republic) Futsal Klub Era-Pack Chrudim	11–1	(Hungary) Üllö FC Csö-Montage Budapest	(Austria) 1. FC Allstars Wiener Neustadt	4–2	(Slovakia) ŠK Mima Divus Trnava
2011-12	(Czech Republic) Futsal Klub Era-Pack Chrudim	3–2	(Croatia) MNK Uspinjača Zagreb	(Hungary) Rába ETO Futsal Club	8–2	(Austria) Stella Rossa Wien
2012-13	(Czech Republic) Futsal Klub Era-Pack Chrudim	3–2	(Poland) Rekord Bielsko-Biała	(Slovakia) sTC Púchov	12–4	(Austria) Stella Rossa Wien
2013-14	(Czech Republic) Futsal Klub Era-Pack Chrudim	league system	(Croatia) MNK Alumnus Zagreb	(Slovenia) KMN Slemen	league system	(Austria) Stella Rossa Wien
2014-15	(Hungary) Rába ETO Futsal Club	2–2 (5–4 p)	(Czech Republic) Futsal Klub Era-Pack Chrudim	(Slovakia) Slov-Matic Bratislava	2–1	(Austria) Stella Rossa Wien
2015-16	(Hungary) Rába ETO Futsal Club	3–2	(Slovenia) KMN Dobovec	(Czech Republic) Futsal Klub Era-Pack Chrudim	7–0	(Austria) Stella Rossa Wien
2016-17	(Hungary) Rába ETO Futsal Club	league system	(Czech Republic) FC Tango Hodonin	(Austria) Stella Rossa Wien	league system	(Germany) TV Wackersdorf
2017-18	(Hungary) Rába ETO Futsal Club	5-3	(Austria) Stella Rossa Wien	(Austria) Futsal Club Liberta Wien	9-2	(Germany) TSV 1860 Munich

== Performances ==
=== By club ===
Club	Winners	Runners-up	Winning seasons	Runners-up seasons
(Czech Republic) Futsal Klub Era-Pack Chrudim	5	1	2009, 2010, 2011, 2012, 2013	2014
(Hungary) Rába ETO Futsal Club	4	–	2014, 2015, 2016, 2017	
(Hungary) Colorspectrum Aramis Budapest	–	1	–	2009
(Hungary) Üllö FC Csö-Montage Budapest	–	1	–	2010
(Croatia) MNK Uspinjača Zagreb	–	1	–	2011
(Croatia) MNK Alumnus Zagreb	–	1	–	2012
(Poland) Rekord Bielsko-Biała	–	1	–	2013
(Slovenia) KMN Dobovec	–	1	–	2015
(Czech Republic) FC Tango Hodonin	–	1	–	2016
(Austria) Stella Rossa Wien	–	1	–	2017

=== By country ===
Country	Winners	Runners-up
Czech Republic	5	2
Hungary	4	2
Croatia	–	2
Poland	–	1
Slovenia	–	1
Austria	–	1

== See also ==
- UEFA Futsal Cup
- Austrian Futsal Liga
- Stella Rossa Wien
