= Geuer =

Geuer is a surname. Notable people with the surname include:

- Margarita Geuer (born 1966), Spanish basketball player
- Nicola Geuer (born 1988), German tennis player

== See also ==
- Neuer (surname)
