= TV Wackersdorf =

German sports club

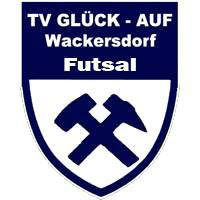
- Full name: Turnverein "Glück-Auf" Wackersdorf 1912 e.V.
- Nickname: Knappen
- Short name: TV Wackersdorf
- Founded: 1912
- Ground: Sporthalle Wackersdorf, Wackersdorf
- Capacity: 1,000
- Chairman: Gerhard Eilers
- Head Coach: Marko Kostic
- League: Futsal-Regionalliga
- 2018–2019: Futsal-Regionalliga Süd, 4th
- Website: http://www.tv-wackersdorf.de/
| Home colours | Away colours |

TV Wackersdorf is a German sports club from Wackersdorf, which was founded in 1912 as Turnverein "Glück-Auf" Wackersdorf 1912 e.V. The club's futsal team plays in the Futsal-Regionalliga, which is the highest level of futsal in Germany.

== Futsal ==
Wackersdorf's futsal team entered the Bayernliga in its inaugural season of 2014/15 and immediately won the league title and promotion to the top division. Wackersdorf are founding members of the Futsal-Regionalliga Süd and finished their first season in the highest division in third place, missing the playoffs for the DFB Futsal Cup by a measly 3 points. During the off-season, they won their own international futsal tournament against German and Czech Republican top teams and the Portus Rothaus Cup in Pforzheim. Wackersdorf took part in the 2016 Mitropa Futsal Cup in Vienna, which is considered one of the most important futsal competitions in Europe. As the first-ever German team to participate in the tournament, they lost to Austrian side Stella Rossa Wien and Hungarian champions and title defenders Győri ETO Futsal Club, but at least won a point against Czech first division side FC Tango Hodonin. The side struggled in the beginning of their second season, but then started to pick up towards the end to finish in fourth place. Over the next few seasons the team is at high tide and fails to do anything memorable. The 19/20 season started off very good, as the team strength boosted the quality of the new transfer players from the First League of Sarbia to make a very good and quality team. By the middle of the team season, Ivan Vuletic and Aleksandar Milenkovic had left, and Christopher Parzefall again was welded to the spot, and Bulgarian national player Marko Kostic was attracted, who was also the coach of the team.

== League results ==
=== Recent seasons ===
The recent season-by-season performance of the club:

| Season | Division | Tier | Position |
| 2014–15 | Futsal-Bayernliga | I | 1st ↑ |
| 2015–16 | Futsal-Regionalliga Süd | I | 3rd |
| 2016–17 | Futsal-Regionalliga Süd | I | 4th |
| 2017–18 | Futsal-Regionalliga Süd | I | 5th |
| 2018–19 | Futsal-Regionalliga Süd | I | 4th |
| 2019–20 | Futsal-Regionalliga Süd | I | |

| ↑ Promoted | ↓ Relegated |

=== All time ===
the highest level of futsal in Germany; the second highest; the third highest.

== Honours ==
- Futsal-Bayernliga:
  - Winners (1): 2015
- Futsal-Regionalliga Süd:
  - 3rd place: 2016
- Mitropa Futsal Cup:
  - 4th place: 2016
- International Wackersdorf Cup:
  - Winners (1): 2016
- Portus Rothaus Cup in Pforzheim:
  - Winners (1): 2016

== Notable players ==
The list of notable TV Wackersdorf players

As of 4 Januar 2020

- **Bold** represents current players.

| Name | Nationality | Position | Wackersdorf career | Appearances | Goals |
|---|---|---|---|---|---|
| Yulian Kurtelov | Bulgaria | FW | 2014–2016 | 17 | 19 |
| **Borislav Stoyanov** | Bulgaria | GK | 2014–2020 | 70 | 1 |
| Markus Giesecke | Germany | DF | 2016–2017 | 14 | 2 |
| Stefan Krachunov | Bulgaria | DF | 2017 | 5 | 2 |
| **Milos Ivic** | Serbia | FW | 2017- | 32 | 27 |
| **Aleksandar Mitushev** | Bulgaria | DF | 2017- | 20 | 5 |

== Team ==
=== Current squad ===
As of 1 February 2020

Note: Flags indicate national team as defined under FIFA eligibility rules; some limited exceptions apply. Players may hold more than one non-FIFA nationality.

| No. | Pos. | Nation | Player |
|---|---|---|---|
| 1 | GK | HUN | Akos Hajdu |
| 2 | FW | SRB | Boris Radisavljevic |
| 3 | DF | BUL | Ivan Gabarov |
| 4 | MF | KAZ | Yussup Frits |
| 5 | MF | GER | Maximilian Schreiner |
| 6 | MF | GER | Christopher Parzefall |
| 7 | MF | SRB | Filip Hristov (vice-captain) |
| 8 | MF | SRB | Zoran Maksimovic |
| 9 | MF | SRB | Bojan Pavlovic |
| 10 | FW | GER | Sven Wagner |
| 11 | FW | SRB | Milos Ivic |
| 13 | DF | BUL | Aleksandar Mitushev |
| 14 | MF | BIH | Ermin Delic |
| 16 | DF | BUL | Marko Kostic |
| 17 | DF | BUL | Stoyan Stoykov (captain) |
| 23 | FW | SRB | Vladimir Kovacevic |
| 24 | GK | BIH | Luka Bevanda |
| 88 | MF | BUL | Hristo Gabarov |

=== Foreign players ===
**EU Nationals**

- (Bulgaria) Ivan Gabarov
- (Bulgaria) Aleksandar Mitushev
- (Bulgaria) Stoyan Stoykov
- (Bulgaria) Borislav Stoyanov
- (Bulgaria) Hristo Gabarov
- (Hungary) Akos Hajdu

**EU Nationals (Dual citizenship)**

- (Serbia) (Bulgaria) Filip Hristov
- (Serbia) (Croatia) Bojan Pavlovic
- (Serbia) (Croatia) Vladimir Kovacevic
- (Bosnia and Herzegovina) (Croatia) Luka Bevanda
- (Kazakhstan) (Germany) Yussup Frits
- (Serbia) (Bulgaria) Marko Kostic

**Non-EU Nationals**

- (Serbia) Boris Radisavljevic
- (Serbia) Zoran Maksimovic
- (Serbia) Milos Ivic
- (Bosnia and Herzegovina) Ermin Delic

=== Technical staff ===
- (Bulgaria) Head Coach: Marko Kostic
- (Bulgaria) Coach:Stoyan Stoykov
- (Serbia) Team Manager: Boris Radisavljevic
- (Serbia) Sports Director: Filip Hristov
- (Serbia) Supervisor: Viktor Ristov

=== National Players ===
- (Bulgaria) Borislav Stoyanov
- (Bulgaria) Marko Kostic

== Sporthalle Wackersdorf ==
The Wackersdorf Sporthalle is located on Hauptstraße 20 in the city of the same name and has all the necessary resources to spend on the Futsal game and a wide variety of sports. The hall has a capacity of 1000 seats, as well as a light panel and sound.
