= 2008 Bavarian Cup =

Football tournament

- Founded
- 1998
- Nation
- Germany
- State
- Bavaria
- Qualifying competition for
- German Cup
- Champions 2008
- SpVgg Unterhaching

The 2008 Bavarian Cup was the eleventh edition of this competition, organised by the Bavarian Football Association (BFV), which was started in 1998. It ended with the SpVgg Unterhaching winning the competition. Together with the finalist, SpVgg Ansbach, both clubs were qualified for the 2008–09 DFB-Pokal.

The competition is open to all senior men's football teams playing within the Bavarian football league system and the Bavarian clubs in the Regionalliga Süd (III) and 3. Liga.

== Rules & History ==
The seven Bezirke in Bavaria each play their own cup competition which in turn used to function as a qualifying to the German Cup (DFB-Pokal). Since 1998 these seven cup-winners plus the losing finalist of the region that won the previous event advance to the newly introduced Bavarian Cup, the Toto-Pokal. The two finalists of this competition advance to the German Cup. Bavarian clubs which play in the first and second Bundesliga are not permitted to take part in the event. The seven regional cup winners plus the finalist from last season's winners region are qualified for the first round.

== Participating clubs ==
The following eight clubs qualified for the 2006 Bavarian Cup:

Club	League	Tier	Cup performance
SpVgg Unterhaching	Regionalliga Süd	III	Winner
SpVgg Ansbach	Oberliga Bayern	IV	Final
SpVgg Landshut	Landesliga Bayern-Mitte	V	Semi-final
ASV Neumarkt	Landesliga Bayern-Mitte	V	Semi-final
1. FC Sonthofen	Landesliga Bayern-Süd	V	First round
SpVgg Selbitz	Landesliga Bayern-Nord	V	First round
Alemannia Haibach	Landesliga Bayern-Nord	V	First round
1. FC Schwandorf	Bezirksliga Oberpfalz Süd	VII	First round

== Bavarian Cup season 2007–08 ==
Teams qualified for the next round in bold.

=== Regional finals ===
Region	Date	Winner	Finalist	Result
Oberbayern Cup	13 May 2008	SpVgg Unterhaching	FC Ingolstadt 04	3–0
Niederbayern Cup	7 May 2008	SpVgg Landshut	FC Dingolfing	2–1
Schwaben Cup	30 April 2008	1. FC Sonthofen	FC Schrobenhausen	2–0
Oberpfalz Cup	13 May 2008	1. FC Schwandorf	FC Amberg	1–0
Mittelfranken Cup	30 April 2008	ASV Neumarkt	**SpVgg Ansbach**	2–0
Oberfranken Cup	12 May 2008	SpVgg Selbitz	SpVgg Bayern Hof	1–0
Unterfranken Cup	12 May 2008	Alemannia Haibach	TSV Grossbardorf	3–1

- The SpVgg Ansbach, runners-up of the Mittelfranken Cup is the eights team qualified for the Bavarian Cup due to SV Seligenporten from Mittelfranken having won the Cup in the previous season.

=== First round ===
Date	Home	Away	Result
21 May 2008	**ASV Neumarkt**	Alemannia Haibach	2–1
22 May 2008	SpVgg Selbitz	**SpVgg Ansbach**	3–3 / 4–7 after pen.
21 May 2008	1. FC Sonthofen	**SpVgg Landshut**	0–2
20 May 2008	1. FC Schwandorf	**SpVgg Unterhaching**	0–8

=== Semi-finals ===
Date	Home	Away	Result
28 May 2008	SpVgg Landshut	**SpVgg Ansbach**	2–2 / 5–7 after pen.
28 May 2008	ASV Neumarkt	**SpVgg Unterhaching**	0–4

=== Final ===
Date	Home	Away	Result	Attendance
18 July 2008	SpVgg Ansbach	**SpVgg Unterhaching**	1–1 / 5–6 after pen.	800

== 2008–09 DFB-Pokal ==
The two clubs, SpVgg Unterhaching and SpVgg Ansbach, who qualified through the Bavarian Cup for the DFB Cup 2008-09 both were knocked out in the first round of the national cup competition:

Round	Date	Home	Away	Result	Attendance
First round	8 August 2008	SpVgg Unterhaching	SC Freiburg	0–2	2,800
First round	10 August 2008	SpVgg Ansbach	Karlsruher SC	0–5	4,000
