= Gerhard Pankotsch =

German footballer

Personal information
- Date of birth: 31 January 1949
- Position: Midfielder

Senior career*
| Years | Team | Apps | (Gls) |
- SpVgg Vohenstrauß
| 1974–1977 | FC 08 Homburg | | |
| 1977–1980 | SpVgg Fürth | | |

Managerial career
- 1981: SpVgg Fürth (caretaker)
- 1982: SpVgg Fürth (caretaker)
- * Club domestic league appearances and goals

Gerhard Pankotsch (born 31 January 1949) is a retired German football midfielder.
