= Cosmos Hoechst =

German futsal club

- Full name: Cosmos Hoechst Frankfurt
- Nickname: Cosmos
- Founded: 2014
- League: Futsal-Regionalliga Süd
- 2016/17: 10th

Cosmos Hoechst is a German Futsal club from Frankfurt. They currently play in the Futsal-Regionalliga Süd.

== Club history ==
The club was founded in 2014 and created by former players of Eintracht Frankfurt Futsal to play in the Hessian Futsal League. Cosmos won the league title in their first season and qualified for the highest German futsal league, the Futsal-Regionalliga Süd.

== Honours ==
- Hessian Futsal League
  - Winners (1): 2015
- Hessian Futsal Cup
  - Winners (1): 2016
