= TSV Weilimdorf =

Logo of the Club

TSV Weilimdorf (officially: TSV Weilimdorf 1948 e.V.) is a German sports and leisure club.

The Futsal team became German champion in 2019 and 2021 and is a founding member of the Futsal Bundesliga, the highest German league in the futsal from the 2021/22 season.

== History ==
At the introduction of the Futsal Regionalliga Süd in 2016, the TSV won the championship and then reached the semi-finals of the German Futsal Championship. In 2019, the TSV became German futsal champions through a 5:4 final victory over the HSV-Panthers. In the new edition of the final of 2019, in 2021, they could prevail again 3:1 against the HSV Panthers and became German Futsal champion for the second time. In the 2021/2022 season, the TSV will participate in the newly founded Futsal Bundesliga.

== Honours ==
2× Deutscher Futsalmeister: 2019, 2021

1× UEFA Futsal Champions League Main round: 2019

5× Champion of the Futsal Regionalliga Süd: 2016, 2018, 2019, 2020, 2021
