= SpVgg Vohenstrauß =

German football club

- Full name: Spielvereinigung Vohenstrauß e.V.
- Founded: 14 November 1922
- Ground: Sportzentrum Vohenstrauß
- Capacity: 1,000
- Chairman: Uli Münchmeier
- Manager: Rainer Summerer
- League: Bezirksliga Oberpfalz-Nord (VII)
- 2015–16: 8th
Home colours	Away colours

The SpVgg Vohenstrauß is a German association football club from the town of Vohenstrauß, Bavaria.

The club's most successful era was in the early 1970s when it spent five season in the tier three Bayernliga.

== History ==
The club was formed on 14 November 1922 but initially became a semi independent department of TV Vohenstrauß. Only in 1928 did the club become fully independent and join the Southern German Football Federation. In 1931 it changed its name to the current one. After falling inactive during the Second World War the club received permission to reform in January 1946.

SpVgg came close to Bayernliga qualification for the first when it won the Upper Palatinate division of the 2. Amateurliga Bayern in 1958 but lost a three-game series promotion round to 1. FC Passau.

Promoted to the Landesliga Bayern-Mitte in 1966 the club instantly became a strong side in the league, finishing fourth in its first season there and third in its second. In the 1968–69 season the club won the league and thereby earned promotion to the tier three Bayernliga.

In the Bayernliga for five seasons from 1969 to 1974 SpVgg Vohenstrauß achieved its best result in its first season there, coming seventh. Gerhard Pankotsch who later played in the second division for SpVgg Fürth and FC Homburg was also the league's top scorer that season with 28 goals. SpVgg declined a little after this but came eighth in 1973. The 1973–74 season however saw the club relegated after coming fifteenth, never to return to the Bayernliga again.

SpVgg Vohenstrauß remained a strong Landesliga sides in the years to come, culminating in a second place in 1976, but from 1978 onwards the club's results declined. Eventually, in 1980 the side was relegated from this league, too, after a seventeenth-place finish. The club did not return to the Landesliga Mitte again, with the league eventually being disbanded in 2012. It played in the Bezirksliga Oberpfalz-Nord for the next three seasons but was relegated from this league, too in 1983. Back in the Bezirksliga SpVgg finished sixth in 1987–88, strong enough to qualify for the new Bezirksoberliga.

The club became a founding member of the Bezirksoberliga Oberpfalz in 1988 but lasted for only one season in this league before being relegated. It made a return to this level in 1995 and this time lasted for four seasons. Initially results were good with two fifth-place finishes in 1996 and 1997. A fifteenth place in 1998–99 meant that the club was relegated again from the Bezirksoberliga and now permanently dropped into local football.

The club after this fluctuated between the Bezirksliga and the Kreisliga below and currently plays in the Bezirksliga Oberpfalz-Nord, the seventh tier of the league system, coming eighth in 2013–14.

== Honours ==
The club's honours:

- Landesliga Bayern-Mitte
  - Champions: 1969
  - Runners-up: 1976
- 2. Amateurliga Oberpfalz
  - Champions: 1958
- Bezirksliga Oberpfalz-Nord
  - Champions: 1995
- Kreisliga Nord
  - Champions: 2012
  - Runners-up: 2009

== Recent seasons ==
The recent season-by-season performance of the club:

Season	Division	Tier	Position
1999–2000	Bezirksliga Oberpfalz-Nord	VII	8th
2000–01	Bezirksliga Oberpfalz-Nord	VII	14th ↓
2001–02			
2002–03			
2003–04			
2004–05	Kreisliga Nord	VIII	3rd
2005–06	Kreisliga Nord	VIII	6th
2006–07	Kreisliga Nord	VIII	9th
2007–08	Kreisliga Nord	VIII	5th
2008–09	Kreisliga Nord	IX	2nd ↑
2009–10	Bezirksliga Oberpfalz-Nord	VIII	13th ↓
2010–11	Kreisliga Nord	IX	11th
2011–12	Kreisliga Nord	IX	1st ↑
2012–13	Bezirksliga Oberpfalz-Nord	VII	7th
2013–14	Bezirksliga Oberpfalz-Nord	VII	8th
2014–15	Bezirksliga Oberpfalz-Nord	VII	9th
2015–16	Bezirksliga Oberpfalz-Nord	VII	8th
2016–17	Bezirksliga Oberpfalz-Nord	VII	

- With the introduction of the Bezirksoberligas in 1988 as the new fifth tier, below the Landesligas, all leagues below dropped one tier. With the introduction of the Regionalligas in 1994 and the 3. Liga in 2008 as the new third tier, below the 2. Bundesliga, all leagues below dropped one tier. With the establishment of the Regionalliga Bayern as the new fourth tier in Bavaria in 2012 the Bayernliga was split into a northern and a southern division, the number of Landesligas expanded from three to five and the Bezirksoberligas abolished. All leagues from the Bezirksligas onwards were elevated one tier.

=== Key ===
↑ Promoted	↓ Relegated
