= Borislav Stoyanov =

Bulgarian footballer

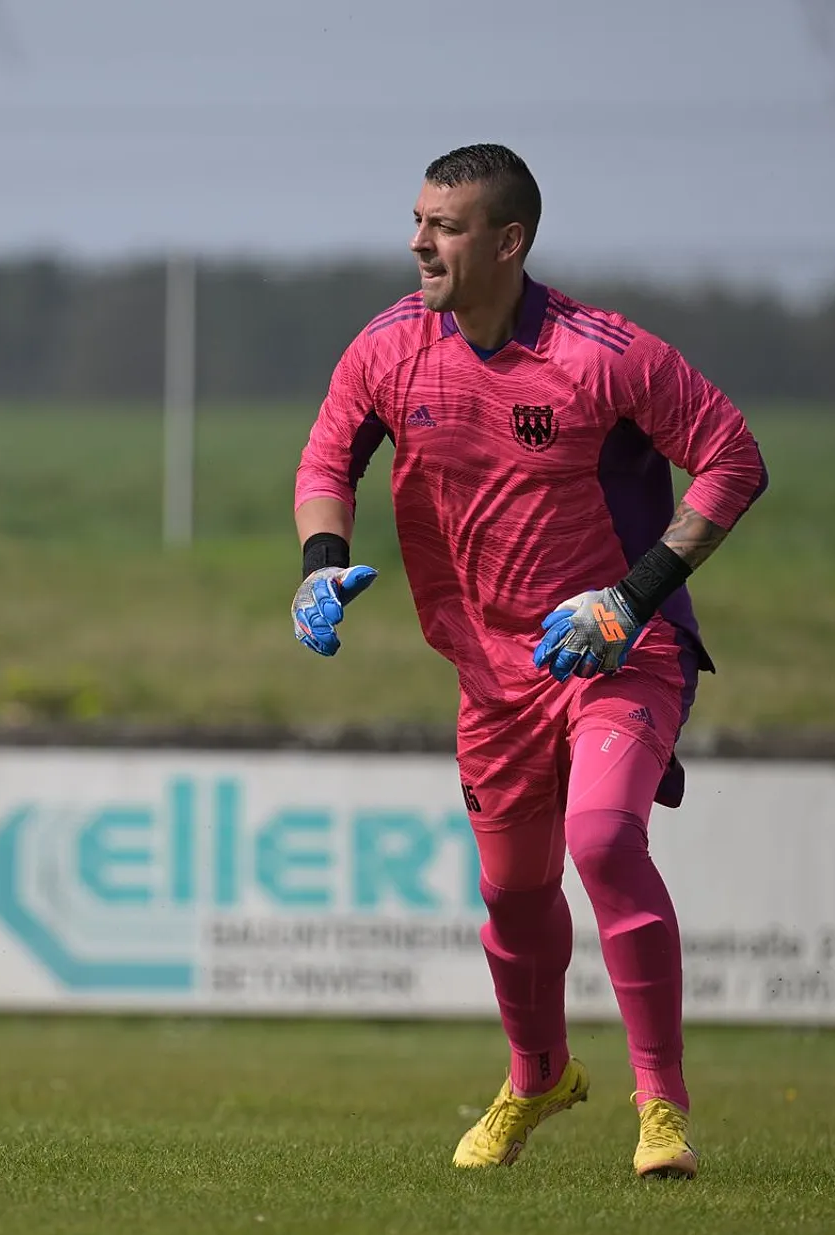

Personal information
- Full name: Borislav Trayanov Stoyanov
- Date of birth: 13 February 1985 (age 41)
- Place of birth: Sofia, Kazichene, Bulgaria
- Height: 1.93 m (6 ft 4 in)
- Position: Goalkeeper

Team information
- Current team: TSV Stulln
- Number: 85

Youth career
- 1993-1997: Kazichene Sofia
- 1997-1999: Iskar Druzhba
- 1999-2001: Lokomotiv Sofia

Senior career*
Years	Team	Apps	(Gls)
2001–2006	Kazichene Sofia	150	(1)
2006	Malesh Mikrevo	18	(0)
2006–2008	Belasitsa Petrich	0	(0)
2008–2010	Malesh Mikrevo	58	(0)
2010–2011	Akademik Sofia	16	(0)
2012	Nesebar	14	(0)
2012–2013	FK Bregalnica Štip	10	(0)
2013–2014	Slivnishki geroi	3	(0)
2014–2015	SV Schwarzhofen	17	(0)
2015–2020	TV Wackersdorf (Futsal)	70	(1)
2016–2019	TV Wackersdorf (Football)	26	(0)
2019-2024	SG Pertolzhofen/Niedermurach	66	(0)
2024-	TSV Stulln	6	(0)

International career^{‡}
2019-	Bulgaria		
- * Club domestic league appearances and goals as of Oktober 29,2024 ‡ National team caps and goals as of Oktober 29,2024

Borislav Stoyanov (Bulgarian: Борислав Траянов Стоянов, born 13 February 1985) is a Bulgarian footballer currently playing for TSV Stulln in the Kreisliga West in the region Cham/Schwandorf as a goalkeeper.

== Youth career ==
He started playing football in the children's team of Kazichene Sofia and then moved to the youth team Iskar Druzhba and then to the youth team of Lokomotiv Sofia.

== Career ==
=== Bulgaria and North Macedonia ===
In the summer of 2001, he played in the team of his native village of Kazichene and stayed there until January 2006, when he transferred to Malesh Mikrevo. Between 2006 and 2008 he played for Belasitsa Petrich. Then he joined Malesh Mikrevo. In 2010, Stoyanov was a major contributor to Malesh Mikrevo's promotion to B PFG. In this season, he achieved a record of 11 straight clean sheets. During the 2010–11 season, he played for Akademik Sofia in six league matches and one match in the Bulgarian Cup. For the 2011–12 season, he moved to Nesebar. In July 2012, he played for FK Bregalnica Štip. For the 2013–14 season, he moved to Slivnishki geroi.

=== Germany ===
In the summer of 2014, he went to Germany and he signed with SV Schwarzhofen in Germany.

Since 2015 he moved to Futsal Club TV Wackersdorf and will play at the highest level of futsal in Germany Futsal-Regionalliga Süd. For the 2019–20 season, he moved to SG Pertolzhofen/Niedermurach to play with his Futsal Club TV Wackersdorf teammates Stoyan Stoykov and Aleksandar Mitushev .

In 2020, he left the team of Futsal ClubTV Wackersdorf and remains to play only football in SG Pertolzhofen/Niedermurach. On July 25, 2021, in a match of the second round, he suffered a serious injury, tearing his Achilles tendon on his left leg.

On 17.07.2022, almost a year after his injury, he returned to the field in an official match in the local derby against Dieterskirchen.

In the summer of 2024, after more than 5 years in the SG Pertolzhofen/Niedermurach team, he transferred to the team of TSV Stulln

== International career ==
In December 2019, Stoyanov earned his first call-up to the Bulgaria national side for a friendly match against Moldova.

== Honours ==
- South-West V AFG
  - Champions 2009–10
  - Runner-Up 2008–09
  - Best Goalkeeper 2009–10
- Kreisklase Nord
  - Champions 2019–21
  - Best Goalkeeper 2019-21
