= German futsal league system =

- Nation
- Germany
- States
- Baden-Württemberg
- Bavaria
- Berlin
- Brandenburg
- Bremen
- Hamburg
- Hesse
- Mecklenburg-Vorpommern
- Lower Saxony
- North Rhine-Westphalia
- Rhineland-Palatinate
- Saarland
- Saxony
- Saxony-Anhalt
- Schleswig-Holstein
- Thuringia
- Current Champions (2016–17)
- SSV Jahn Regensburg

The German futsal league system, or league pyramid, refers to the hierarchically interconnected league system for Futsal in Germany that in the 2017–18 season consists of the DFB Futsal Cup and 35 divisions, in which all divisions are bound together by the principle of promotion and relegation. Teams that finish at the top of their division at the end of each season can rise higher in the pyramid, while those that finish at the bottom find themselves sinking further down. In theory, it is possible for even the lowest local club to rise to the top of the system and become German futsal champions one day. The number of teams promoted and relegated between the divisions varies, and promotion to the upper levels of the pyramid is usually contingent on meeting additional criteria, especially concerning appropriate facilities and finances.

== Structure ==
The German futsal league system is held under the jurisdiction of the nationwide German Football Association.

On top of the system is the DFB Futsal Cup, an annual tournament to determine the German futsal champion and the team to represent Germany in the UEFA Futsal Cup. It is followed by the level one Futsal-Regionalliga, which is divided into 5 regional divisions under the 5 regional associations of the German Football association, these being the Northern German Football Association, the Northeastern German Football Association, the Western German Football Association, the Southwestern Regional Football Association and the Southern German Football Association. For Bavaria, the Bavarian Football Association, a member state association of the Southern German Football Association, runs their top division under their own jurisdiction. For the Southwest, a Futsal-Regionalliga has not yet been launched and the participants for the DFB Futsal Cup are determined by a futsal tournament.

Starting at level five, the various fully amateur divisions are usually governed by the 21 state associations.

Level	Division				
	DFB Futsal Cup; 10 teams annual tournament ↑ 1 champion to UEFA Futsal Cup				
1	Futsal-Regionalliga Nord; 8 teams ↑ 1 champion + 1 playoff spot	NOFV-Futsal-Liga; 10 teams ↑ 1 champion + 1 playoff spot	Futsalliga West; 10 teams ↑ 1 champion + 1 runner-up ↓ 3 relegation spots	Southwestern Region several teams annual tournament ↑ 1 champion + 1 playoff spot	Futsal-Regionalliga Süd; 10 teams ↑ 1 champion + 1 playoff spot ↓ 1 relegation spot + 1 relegation playoff spot
2	NFV-Futsal-Liga; 2 divisions 11 teams ↑ 1 promotion playoff spot Futsal-Verbandsliga Bremen; 4 teams ↑ 1 promotion playoff spot Futsal-Liga Hamburg; 8 teams ↑ 1 promotion playoff spot ↓ 1 relegation spot	Futsal-Verbandsliga Berlin; 10 teams ↑ 1 promotion playoff spot ↓ 1 relegation spot Futsal-Verbandsliga Sachsen-Anhalt	Futsal-Mittelrheinliga; 12 teams ↑ 1 promotion spot Futsal-Niederrheinliga; 7 teams ↑ 1 promotion spot ↓ 1 relegation spot Futsal-Oberliga Westfalen; 8 teams ↑ 1 promotion spot ↓ 1 relegation spot		Futsal-Bayernliga; 8 teams ↑ 1 promotion playoff spot Futsal-Hessenliga; 6 teams ↑ 1 promotion playoff spot ↓ 1 relegation spot + 1 relegation playoff spot Futsal-Liga Baden; 4 teams ↑ 1 promotion playoff spot Futsal-Liga Württemberg; 7 teams ↑ 1 promotion playoff spot
3	Futsal-Landesliga (Hamburg); 8 teams ↑ 1 promotion spot Futsal-Kreisliga (Harburg); 5 teams	Futsal-Landesliga Berlin; 10 teams ↑ 1 promotion spot	Futsal-Landesliga (Niederrhein); 10 teams ↑ 1 promotion spot Futsal-Westfalenliga (Westfalen); 2 divisions		Futsal-Bezirksliga (Bavaria); 6 divisions Futsal-Verbandsliga (Hessia); 6 teams ↑ 1 promotion spot + 1 playoff spot
4					Futsal-Kreisliga (Hessia); 4 divisions
