= MVFC Berettyóújfalu =

- Full name: Mezei-Vill Futsal Club Berettyóújfalu
- Nicknames: MVFC, Mezei, Beri, Berettyó
- Short name: Mezei-Vill FC
- Founded: 2004
- Ground: Pálfi István Rendezvénycsarnok, Berettyóújfalu
- Capacity: 1,350
- Chairman: József Mezei
- Head Coach: József Turzó
- League: Nemzeti Bajnokság I
- 2025-2026: Nemzeti Bajnokság I, 8th
- Website: http://mvfc.hu/
Home colours	Away colours

Mezei-Vill Futsal Club Berettyóúfalu is a Hungarian futsal club from Berettyóújfalu, that plays in the Nemzeti Bajnokság I, the top division for futsal in Hungary.

== Honours ==
- Nemzeti Bajnokság I:
  - Winners (4): 2008, 2009, 2014, 2019
- Magyar Kupa:
  - Winners (4): 2009, 2012, 2019, 2025
- Magyar Szuperkupa:
  - Winners (2): 2008, 2009

== Team 2025/26 ==
=== Current squad ===
#	Country	Name
5	(Hungary)	Botond Hudák
6	(Hungary)	Imre Nagy
7	(Hungary)	Lajos Mátyás Szabó
8	(Hungary)	Zoltán Szalmás
9	(Hungary)	János Rábl
10	(Hungary)	Dominik Iszák
13	(Hungary)	Dávid Mezei (GK)
15	(Hungary)	Csaba Magyari
21	(Hungary)	Martin Petró (GK)
27	(Hungary)	Richárd Nagy
29	(Hungary)	Péter Szabó (C)
	(Hungary)	Zoltán Balogh

=== Technical staff ===
Position	Country	Name
President	(Hungary)	József Mezei
Head coach	(Hungary)	József Turzó
Fitness coach	(Hungary)	Dávid Daróczi
Masseur	(Hungary)	Bence Botos
Section leader	(Hungary)	Róbert Szitkó
Technical director	(Hungary)	Martin Milán Daróczi
Media and press	(Hungary)	Vince Fábián
Media and press	(Hungary)	Milán Ulics
Media and press	(Hungary)	Péter Vezendi

== Head coaches ==
Year	Country	Name
2004–2010	(Hungary)	Róbert Szitkó
2010–2011	(Slovakia)	Richárd Bacsó
2011–2016	(Hungary)	József Turzó
2016-2017 (*)	(Romania)	Moga Flavius Lorant
2017–2021	(Spain)	Sergio Mullor Cabrera
2021-2024	(Hungary)	János Trencsényi
2024-	(Hungary)	József Turzó

(*) - Change during the season
