= Neuner =

Neuner is a German occupational surname, which originally meant a person who was on a council of nine members (literally, a "niner"), derived from the Middle High German niun ("nine"). The name may refer to:

- Angelika Neuner (born 1969), Austrian luger
- Doris Neuner (born 1971), Austrian luger
- Frank Neuner (born 1971), German psychologist
- Helga Neuner (born 1940), German actress
- Magdalena Neuner (born 1987), German athlete
- Martin Neuner (1900–1944), German ski jumper

== See also ==
- Mount Neuner, Antarctica
