= Frank Neuner =

Professor of Clinical Psychology

Frank Neuner (born 1971) is professor of Clinical Psychology at Faculty of Psychology and Sports Science, Bielefeld University.

== Academia ==
Frank Neuner heads the Chair of Clinical Psychology and Psychotherapy, including the affiliated treatment facilities and the Institute for Postgraduate Therapy Training. The research includes fundamental neuroscientific studies on the effects of violence on the brain and extends to epidemiological studies and experimental therapy studies with traumatized survivors of war, torture, and natural disasters in current and former war zones, e.g., in Uganda, Rwanda, and Sri Lanka. In 2004 he gains the Award of the Foundation “Science and Society”, Konstanz and the Award for promising young talents of the Section Clinical Psychology of the German Psychological Society. He is member of the Association of Psychological Sciences (APS) (since 2008) and also member of vivo e. V. (chairman from 2001 to 2008.

== Research ==
- Consequences of traumatic stress during development: Epidemiology and treatment of former child soldiers in Uganda (DFG, 2007-ongoing)
- Multicenter NETwork (EU)
- Improvement of healthcare for refugees (vivo Italy, 2007–2009)
- Psychological disorders and treatment in orphans in Ethiopia and Rwanda (MWK Baden-Württemberg, 2006–2008)
- Change of neural network indicators through narrative treatment of PTSD in torture victims (DFG, 2006–2009)
- Violence, its impact and coping strategies (VolkswagenFoundation, Mweya, Uganda, 2004)

== Selected publications ==
- with H. Adenauer, S. Pinösch, C. Catani, H. Aichinger, J. Keil, and K. Kißler. 2010. Early processing of threat cues in posttraumatic stress disorder – evidence for a cortical vigilance-avoidance reaction. Biological Psychiatry.
- with C. Catani, A. Gewirtz, L. Wieling, E. Schauer, and T. Elbert. 2010. Tsunami, war, and cumulative risk in the life of Sri Lankan school children. Child Development.
- with S. Kurreck, M. Ruf, M. Odenwald, T. Elbert, and M. Schauer. 2010. Can asylum seekers with posttraumatic stress disorder be successfully treated? A randomized controlled pilot study. Cognitive Behaviour Therapy 39: 81–91.
- with C. Catani, E. Schauer, T. Elbert, I. Missmahl, and J. P. Bette. 2009. War trauma, child labor, and family violence: Life adversities and PTSD in a sample of school children in Kabul. Journal of Traumatic Stress 22: 163–171.
- with S. Schaal, and T. Elbert. 2009. Narrative exposure therapy versus group interpersonal psychotherapy – a controlled clinical trial with orphaned survivors of the Rwandan genocide. Psychotherapy and Psychosomatics 78: 298–306.
- with P. Onyut, V. Ertl, E. Schauer, M. Odenwald, and T. Elbert. 2008. Treatment of posttraumatic stress disorder by trained lay counsellors in an African refugee settlement – a randomized controlled trial. Journal of Consulting and Clinical Psychology 76: 686–694.
- with D. J. F. De Quervain, I. T. Kolassa, V. Ertl, P. L. Onyut, T. Elbert, and A. Papassotiropulos. 2007. A deletion variant of the α (2B)-adrenoceptor is related to enhanced emotional memory in European and African populations. Nature Neuroscience 10: 1137–1139.
- with M. Odenwald, H. Hinkel, E. Schauer, M. Schauer, T. Elbert, and B. Rockstroh. 2007. The consumption of khat and other drugs in Somali combatants: A cross-sectional study. PLoS Medicine 4(12): e341.
- with E. Schauer, C. Catani, M. Ruf, and T. Elbert. 2006. Post-Tsunami stress – posttraumatic stress disorder in children living in three severely affected regions in Sri Lanka. Journal of Traumatic Stress 19: 339–349.
- with M. Schauer, U. Karunakara, C. Klaschik, and T. Elbert. 2004. A comparison of narrative exposure therapy, supportive counseling and psychoeducation for treating posttraumatic stress disorder in an African refugee settlement. Journal of Consulting and Clinical Psychology 72(4): 579–587.

Personal Website
