= Kazichene =

Kazichene Казичене
- Location of Kazichene
- Coordinates: 42°40′N 23°28′E
- Country: Bulgaria
- Province (Oblast): Sofia City

Government
  - Mayor: Grigor Grigorov
- Elevation: 570 m (1,870 ft)

Population (1.1.2007)
  - Total: 4,997
- Time zone: UTC+2 (EET)
  - Summer (DST): UTC+3 (EEST)
- Postal Code: 1532
- Area code: 02992

Kazichene (Bulgarian: Казичене [kɐˈzit͡ʃɛnɛ]) is a large village in the Pancharevo district to the east of the Bulgarian capital of Sofia. As of 2007, the village officially had 4,977 inhabitants. Because of its close proximity to the Sofia ring road and the nearby railroad, over the past decade the area has developed into an industrial-storage zone with a logistics center and offices of a number of prominent companies such as Werta Logistics, Balkan Steel Engineering, and the Chipita snacks factory.

There is a large lake near Kazichene where the Litex water park is located. Built in the mid-1980s, today the park is the only place in Bulgaria offering boatless water skiing and wakeboarding.

The village has a single football club, FC Kazichene, playing in the Bulgarian fourth division, known as the A OFG. Several prominent footballers have ended their careers there, including Emil Kremenliev and Ivan Vasilev. The town is also known for being the birthplace of Plamen Krumov, a current Levski Sofia footballer, and Borislav Stoyanov, who plays for SV Schwarzhofen.

Kazichene Cove on Low Island in the South Shetland Islands, Antarctica is named after Kazichene.

== Gallery ==
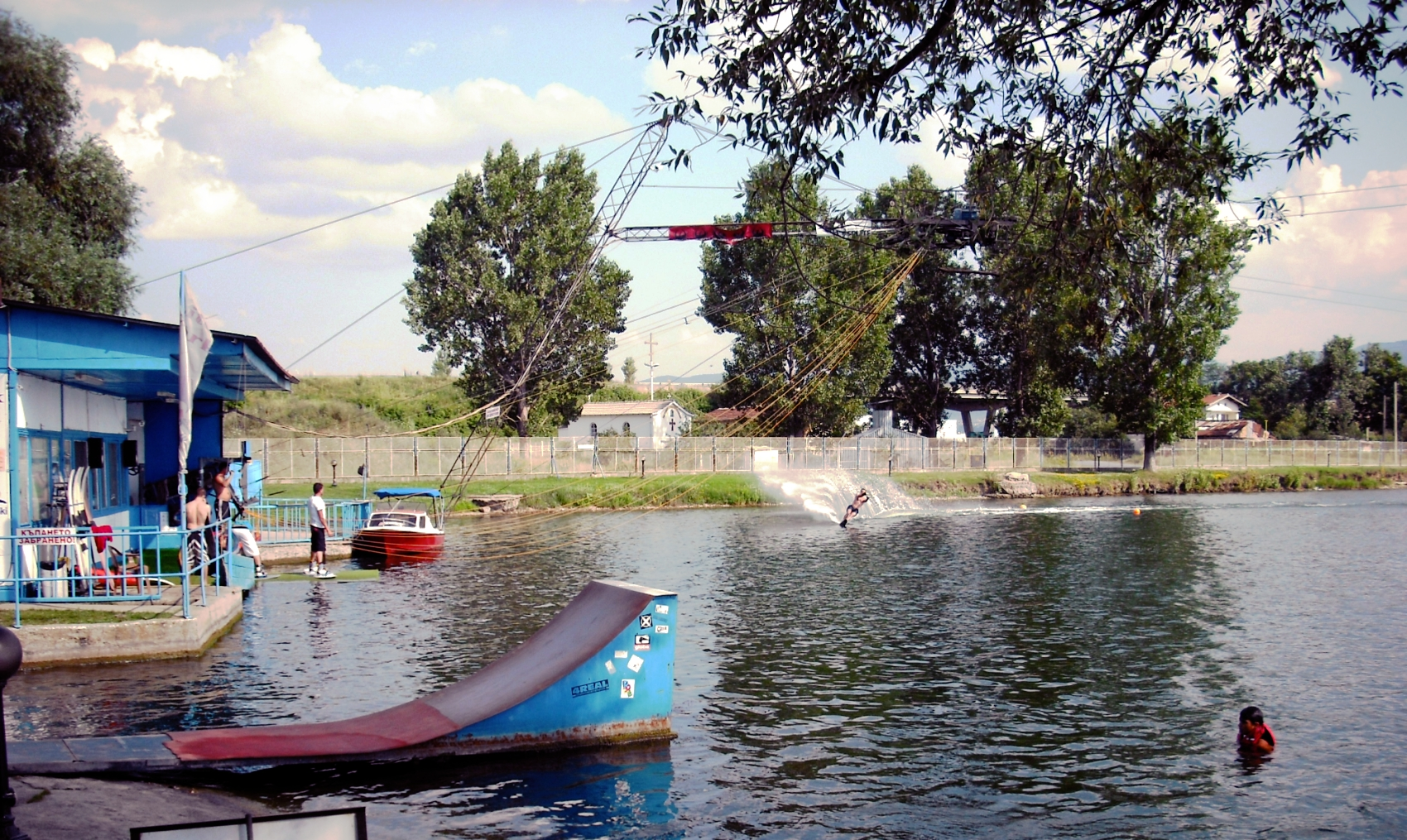
The water ski lift station

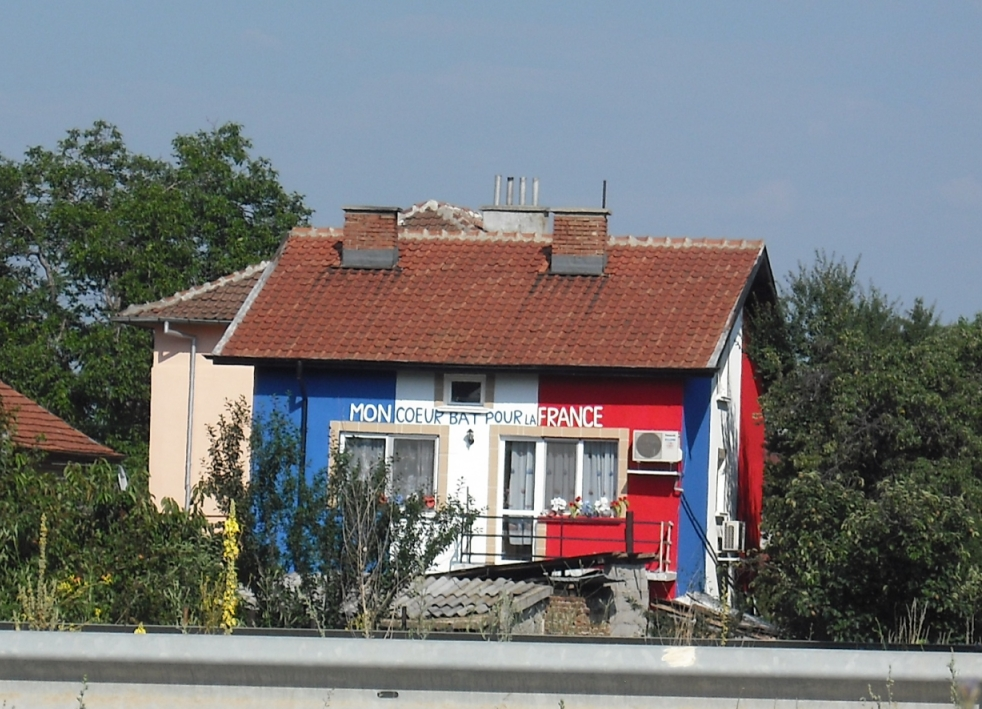
The "French House" in Kazichene, with the inscription "My Heart Beats for France"

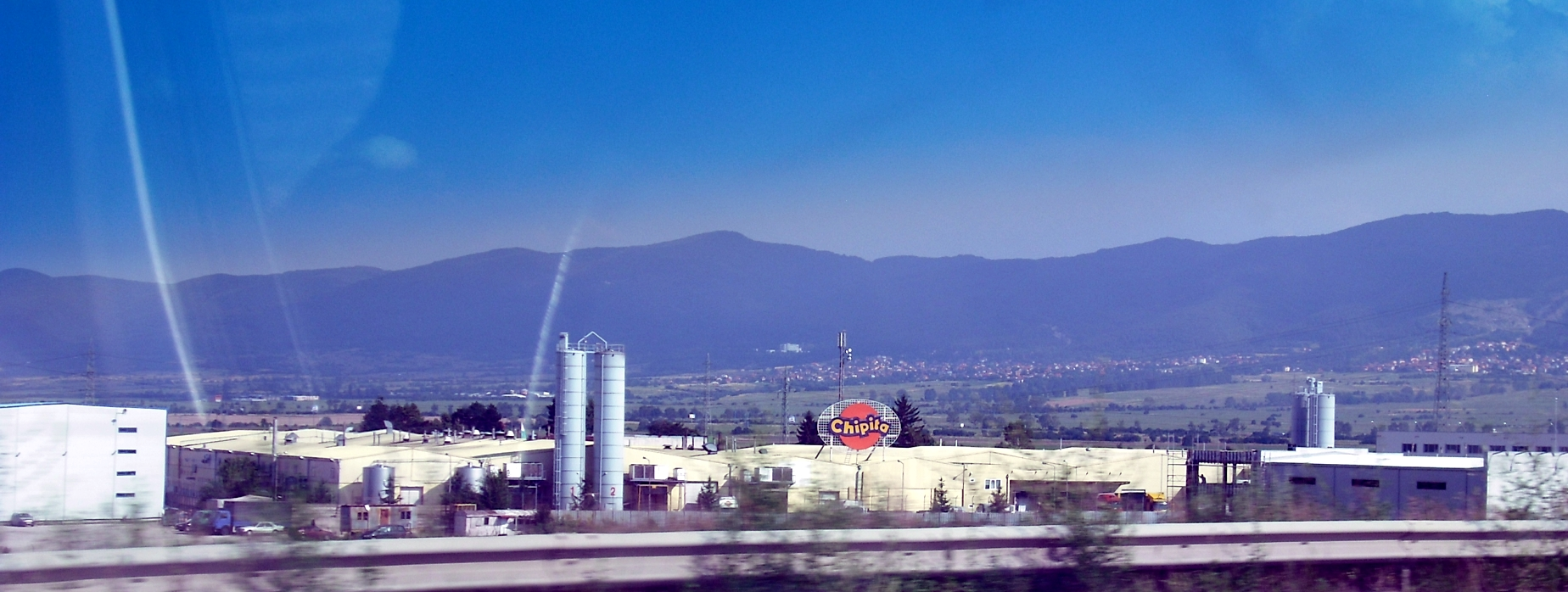
The Chipita Snacks Factory
