= Association of German railway sports clubs =

The Association of German railway sports clubs (German: Verband Deutscher Eisenbahner-Sportvereine – VDES) is the governing body for multiple-sports clubs in Germany associated with the German railway, historically the Deutsche Reichsbahn and currently the Deutsche Bahn. It is based in Frankfurt am Main.

The association has over 300 member clubs and 120,000 individual members.

== History ==
The association was formed on 7 March 1926, then under the name of Bund der Deutschen Reichsbahn-Turn- und Sportvereine. By 1939 this association had over 700 member clubs with 300,000 individual members. After the Second World War the association was restarted in West Germany in 1948, now under the name of Arbeitsgemeinschaft der Eisenbahner-Sportvereine. The association was officially reformed in 1950 while, in the same year, the Sportvereinigung Lokomotive was formed for the same purpose in East Germany. In 1951 the association joined the USIC - Union Sportive Internationale des Cheminots, an international organisation formed in 1947. In 1957 the East German association joined the USIC, too. After the German reunion in 1991 the two associations from East and West Germany merged to form the current association.
