= CD Internacional Intxaurrondo =

Spanish futsal club

C.D. Internacional de Intxaurrondo
- Full name: Club Deportivo Internacional de Intxaurrondo
- Nickname(s): Intxa Futsal founded = 1990
- Ground: Polideportivo Mons, San Sebastián; Spain
- Capacity: 500
- Manager: Mario Alberdi
- League: 2ª División B – Group 2
- 2016–17: 2ª División B – Group 2, 16th

Club Deportivo Internacional de Intxaurrondo, or in short Inter, is a futsal club based in San Sebastián, city of the province of Guipuzcoa in the Autonomous Community of the Basque Country. The club was founded in 1990 and its home arena is the Polideportivo Mons with capacity of approx. 500 spectators.

== Club history ==
The club's first team has twice won the Liga Vasca, the highest futsal league in the Basque Country, in 2001–02 and 2010–11, and made it to the Tercera División de Futsal. Inter's greatest success came in 2016, when the first team earned promotion to the tier-three Segunda División B de Futsal for the first time. They finished second in the Tercera, one point behind champions Laskorain K.E., but the team from Tolosa, Spain decided to renounce promotion.

== Honours ==
- Liga Vasca de Futsal:
  - Winners (2): 2002, 2011
- Tercera División de Futsal:
  - Runners-up: 2016

== Season to season ==
As of 9 September 2017

Season	Tier	Division	Place	Notes
2001–02	5	Liga Vasca de Futsal	1st	
2002–03	4	3ª Nacional	—	
2003–04	4	3ª Nacional	—	
2004–05	4	3ª Nacional	10th	
2005–06	4	3ª Nacional	15th	
2006–07	5	Liga Vasca	12th	
2007–08	5	Liga Vasca	8th	
2008–09	5	Liga Vasca	4th	

Season	Tier	Division	Place	Notes
2009–10	4	3ª Nacional	16th	
2010–11	5	Liga Vasca	1st	
2011–12	4	3ª Nacional	13th	
2012–13	4	3ª Nacional	8th	
2013–14	4	3ª Nacional	6th	
2014–15	4	3ª Nacional	7th	
2015–16	4	3ª Nacional	2nd	
2016–17	3	2ª Nacional	16th	

- 1 season in Segunda División B
- 10 seasons in Tercera División
