= UFC Münster =

- Full name: Universitäts-Futsal-Club Münster e.V.
- Founded: 2002
- Dissolved: 2025
- Ground: Universitäts-Sporthalle, Münster, NRW, Germany
- Website: https://www.ufc-muenster.de

UFC Münster (officially: Universitäts-Futsal-Club Münster e.V.) was a German futsal club from Münster. The club has won the DFB-Futsal-Cup, the German futsal championship, twice.

== History ==
In 2002, a football team from the University of Münster traveled to a tournament in Portugal and were surprised to find the games were played by futsal rules. Upon returning, the UFC Münster club was founded, with the name representing the club's connection to the university. A year later, the club won the inaugural WFLV Futsal League and qualified for the DFB Futsal Cup, which they won 3–1 on penalties against SVG Göttingen 07. Two years later, they won their second German championship, defeating TSC Stuttgart 6–3 in the final.

While remaining dominant in West Germany, the club's successes at the national level became more sporadic. They finished 4th in 2009 and 3rd in 2012. Between seasons, the club withdrew from the WFLV Futsal League in 2009/10 to protest the low status of futsal in the associations, but returned the following year and immediately won the league title. It wasn't until 2013 that they reached the German championship final again, but lost 3–6 to the Hamburg Panthers. The club has twice participated in the UEFA Futsal Cup, but was eliminated in the qualifying round both times.

In recent years, the club has struggled, narrowly avoiding relegation in the 2018/19 season. The women's team, however, has found more success, winning the WFLV Futsal League title in 2016, 2017, 2018, 2019, and 2022.

In 2025 UFC Münster joinend the much biggger club Preußen Münster. UFC did a complete cancellation as a club and restartet as Preußens Münster own futsal branch.

== Honors ==
- DFB-Futsal-Cup winners: 2006, 2008
- Futsalliga West (WFLV Futsal League) champions (men): 2006, 2008, 2009, 2010, 2012, 2013, 2014, 2015
- Futsalliga West (Women) champions (women): 2016, 2017, 2018, 2019, 2022
