= Futsal-Regionalliga =

Regionalliga
- Country: Germany
- Confederation: UEFA (Europe)
- Number of clubs: ≈55
- Level on pyramid: 2
- Promotion to: qualifiers for the Futsal-Bundesliga
- Relegation to: Verbandsliga
- Current champions: TSV Weilimdorf (Süd); Fortuna Düsseldorf (West); VfL 05 Hohenstein-Ernstthal (Nordost); HSV-Panthers (Nord); TSG TSG 1846 Mainz-Bretzenheim (Südwest)
- Current: 2016–17 Futsal-Regionalliga

The Futsal-Regionalliga (German pronunciation: [ʁeɡi̯oˈnaːlˌliːɡa]) is the first tier of futsal in the German futsal league system.

== History of the Futsal-Regionalliga ==
The Futsal-Regionalliga West was introduced in 2005 with nine teams and UFC Münster were crowned the first champions. The NOFV-Pelada-Futsal-Liga was introduced in the 2013–14 season with seven teams and the Futsal-Regionalliga Süd in the 2015–16 season with seven teams.

Currently, there are three leagues which are the highest of four divisions in German futsal:

- Futsal-Regionalliga Nord, (8 teams covering the states of Bremen, Hamburg, Lower Saxony and Schleswig-Holstein)
- Futsal-Regionalliga West, (10 teams covering the state of North Rhine-Westphalia)
- Futsal-Regionalliga Nordost, (12 teams in 2 groups covering parts of Eastern Germany)
- Futsal-Regionalliga Süd, (10 teams covering the states of Bavaria, Hessia and Baden-Württemberg)
- Futsal Regionalliga Südwest, (5 teams covering the states of Saarland and Rhineland-Palatinate)

== League setup ==
=== Promotion ===
The champions of each division take part in the Playoffs for the Promotion to the Futsal Bundesliga.

=== Relegation ===
The bottom teams of each division are relegated directly or compete in a relegation playoff round.

== Champions ==
=== 2015– ===
| Season | Regionalliga Nord | Regionalliga Nordost | Regionalliga West | Regionalliga Süd |
|---|---|---|---|---|
| 2015–16 | | VfL 05 Hohenstein-Ernstthal | Holzpfosten Schwerte | TSV Weilimdorf |
| 2016–17 | | | | |
