= Juanra (futsal player) =

Spanish futsal player

Personal information
- Full name: Juan Ramón Calvo Rodríguez
- Date of birth: 1 September 1982 (age 44)
- Place of birth: Madrid, Spain
- Position: Midfielder

Team information
- Current team: META Catania Bricocity (manager)

Senior career*
Years	Team	Apps	(Gls)
1999–2000	Sanse		
2000–2001	Alcobendas		
2001–2003	Interviú		
2003–2005	Caja Segovia		
2005–2006	Guadalajara		
2006–2008	C. Torrejón		
2008–2011	Interviú		
2011–2012	Navarra		
2012–2018	Rába ETO		
2018–2019	Piliscsabai Atlétikai és Futball Club		
2019	ETO SZC Futsal Club		

International career
	Spain	13	

Managerial career
- 2019-2023: Haladás VSE
- 2023-: META Catania Bricocity
- * Club domestic league appearances and goals

Juan Ramón Calvo Rodríguez (born 1 September 1982) is a Spanish former futsal player, and the current manager of the META Catania Bricocity.

== Honours ==
- 1 League (01/02)
- 2 Supercopas de España (01/02, 08/09)
- 1 Copa de España (08/09)
- 1 UEFA Futsal Cup (2009)
- 1 Madrid Cup (2006)
- 1 best winger LNFS (06/07)
- 1 UEFA Futsal Championship (2010)
