= Austrian Futsal Liga =

- Founded: 2002
- Country: Austria
- Confederation: UEFA
- Number of clubs: 12
- Level on pyramid: 1
- International cup: UEFA Futsal Champions League
- Current champions: FC Diamant Linz
- Most championships: Stella Rossa Vienna & 1.FC Allstars Wiener Neustadt (5)
- Current: Current Season at UEFA.com

The Austrian Futsal Liga is the premier futsal league in Austria. It was founded in 2002. The league is played under UEFA rules and organized by Austrian Football Association, currently consists of 12 teams. From 2002 - 2005 the champion was crowned at a final tournament with prior qualification tournaments. From 2006 - 2009 the Austrian Futsal League was governed by Austria Futsal. From the 2010-11' season onwards the championship is governed by the Austrian Football Association.

== Winning clubs ==
Season	Champions
2002-03	Olida Ceramic Vienna
2003-04	FC Best Putz Linz
2004-05	AKA U19 St. Polten
2005-06	USC Eugendorf
2006-07	Stella Rossa Vienna
2007-08	1.FC Futsal Graz
2008-09	Murexin All Stars
2009-10	Stella Rossa tipp3 Wien
2010-11	Stella Rossa tipp3 Wien
2011-12	1. FC Allstars Wiener Neustadt
2012-13	Stella Rossa tipp3 Wien
2013-14	FSC Schwaz
2014-15	Stella Rossa tipp3 Wien
2015-16	SC Kaiserebersdorf
2016-17	FC Diamant Linz
2017-18	1. FC Murexin Allstars Wr. Neustadt
2018-19	1. FC Murexin Allstars Wr. Neustadt
2019-20	1. FC Murexin Allstars Wr. Neustadt
2020-21	FC Diamant Linz

=== Results by team ===
Club	Titles	Years won
Stella Rossa	5	2007, 2010, 2011, 2013, 2015
Murexin All Stars	5	2009, 2012, 2018, 2019, 2020
FC Diamant Linz	2	2017, 2021
1. FC Futsal Graz	1	2008
Eugendorf	1	2006
AKA U19 St. Polten	1	2005
FC Best Putz Linz	1	2004
Olida Ceramic Vienna	1	2003
SC Kaiserebersdorf-Srbija 08	1	2016

== All-time AUSTRIAN FUTSAL LEAGUE TABLE ==
Seasons 2006/07 - 2020/21

Pos	Team	Seasons	Played	Won	Drawn	Lost	G.F.	G.A.	G.D.	Points
1	1.FC Allstars Wiener Neustadt	14	205	152	18	35	1337	616	721	474
2	Stella Rossa Wien	15	214	145	26	43	1156	607	461	461
3	Polonia FC Wien	13	189	65	21	106	714	1009	−295	207
4	Futsal Klagenfurt	8	119	64	12	43	682	509	173	204
5	Futsal Schwaz	4	70	49	5	16	431	258	173	152
6	FC Diamant Linz	5	67	47	7	13	387	233	154	148
7	Futsal Innsbruck	10	147	41	12	94	508	804	−296	135
8	Fortuna Wiener Neustadt	7	93	39	12	42	537	508	29	129
9	Dynamo Triestingtal	6	106	41	6	59	479	572	−93	129
10	Vienna Calcio International	6	95	38	9	48	398	418	−20	123
11	PFC Liberta Legion Wien	5	59	32	8	19	298	237	61	104
12	1.FSC Sturm Graz	5	68	32	4	33	306	279	81	100
13	Futsal Club Brasil Dornbirn	5	72	30	7	35	290	310	−20	97
14	Vienna Walzer	4	50	20	0	30	264	305	−41	60
15	SV Georgia Wien	3	54	16	6	32	200	336	−136	54
16	Futsal Saalfelden	4	45	14	5	26	154	259	−105	47
17	SC Kaiserebersdorf-Srbija	1	18	14	1	3	98	36	62	43
18	Club Leoben 06	3	31	12	4	15	123	113	10	40
19	Futsal Club Komusina St.Lambrecht	4	41	10	6	25	153	233	−80	36
20	Cafe Hegelhof RB Wien	2	34	10	5	19	143	191	−48	35
21	FSV St.Pölten	2	25	10	0	15	144	151	−7	30
22	youngCaritas Käfig League Wien	3	35	9	3	21	185	305	−120	30
23	SFK Libero Graz	3	35	9	1	25	157	219	−62	28
24	SV Fohnsdorf	4	45	8	4	33	122	262	−140	28
25	Futsal Club GRZ	2	25	7	3	15	129	177	−48	24
26	Futsal Vienna	2	36	6	4	26	102	253	−151	22
27	Futsal Tirol	1	14	5	2	7	53	67	−14	17
28	TSV Neumarkt	2	18	5	2	11	57	119	−62	17
29	SC Ebental	1	9	1	0	8	30	58	−28	3
30	FC Internazionale Wien	1	8	1	0	7	33	99	−66	3
31	SC Neusiedl am See	1	18	0	1	17	43	123	−80	1
32	HNK Tomislavgrad Vienna	1	9	0	0	9	24	71	−47	0

- Updated at completion of 2020–21 season.

League or status at 2020–21 season:

Austria Futsal League
Austria Second Futsal League
COVID-19 break
Club disbanded
