= Nemzeti Bajnokság I (men's futsal) =

Hungarian sports league

- Founded: 1993
- Country: Hungary
- Confederation: UEFA
- Number of clubs: 12
- Level on pyramid: 1
- Relegation to: Nemzeti Bajnokság II
- Domestic cup: Magyar Kupa
- International cup: UEFA Futsal Champions League
- Current champions: Újpest FC (1) (2025-26)
- Most championships: Győri ETO Futsal Club (8)
- Website: www.mlsz.hu

Nemzeti Bajnokság I (English: National Championship I, commonly abbreviated NB I) is the premier futsal league in Hungary, administered by the Hungarian Football Federation. The league, which is played under UEFA rules, was founded in 1993 and currently consists of 12 teams.

== Teams 2024/25 ==
- A’ Studió Futsal Nyíregyháza
- Aramis SE
- B-Kerép Nyírbátori SC
- DEAC
- Haladás VSE
- Magyar Futsal Akadémia
- MVFC Berettyóújfalu
- Rubeola FC
- SG Kecskemét Futsal
- TFSE-Tent Budapest
- Újpest FC
- Vehir.hu Futsal Veszprém

== Champions ==
Season	Champions
1993	Lőrinc FC
1994	Apenta Nestlé
1995	Lőrinc FC
1995–1996	Külker FC
1996–1997	Apenta Nestlé
1997–1998	In Time Aramis SE
1998–1999	Külker FC
1999–2000	In Time Aramis SE
2000–2001	Cső-Montage BFC
2001–2002	Cső-Montage BFC
2002–2003	Cső-Montage BFC
2003–2004	Rubeola FC Csömör
2004–2005	In Time Aramis SE
2005–2006	Gödöllői Futsal Klub
2006–2007	Gödöllői Futsal Klub
2007–2008	MVFC Berettyóújfalu
2008–2009	MVFC Berettyóújfalu
2009–2010	Győri ETO Futsal Club
2010–2011	Győri ETO Futsal Club
2011–2012	Győri ETO Futsal Club
2012–2013	Győri ETO Futsal Club
2013–2014	MVFC Berettyóújfalu
2014–2015	Győri ETO Futsal Club
2015–2016	Győri ETO Futsal Club
2016–2017	Győri ETO Futsal Club
2017–2018	Győri ETO Futsal Club
2018–2019	MVFC Berettyóújfalu
2019–2020	-
2020–2021	Haladás VSE
2021–2022	Haladás VSE
2022–2023	Haladás VSE
2023–2024	Haladás VSE
2024–2025	1. Futsal Club Veszprém
2025–2026	Újpest FC

== Championship titles by teams ==
- 8x: Győri ETO Futsal Club
- 4x: Haladás VSE, MVFC Berettyóújfalu
- 3x: Aramis SE, Cső-Montage BFC
- 2x: Apenta Nestlé, Gödöllői FK, Külker FC, Lőrinc FC
- 1x: 1. Futsal Club Veszprém, Rubeola FC Csömör, Újpest FC
