= Stella Rossa Wien =

Stella Rossa
- Full name: Stella Rossa
- Founded: 1998
- Ground: Vienna, Austria
- Capacity: ?
- League: Murexin Futsal Bundesliga
- 2009-10: Murexin Futsal Bundesliga, champion
Home colours	Away colours

Stella Rossa is a futsal club based in Vienna, Austria. The club was founded in 1998, played in the Murexin Futsal Bundesliga.

== Squad players ==
- Milan Djuricic(Gk)
- Sinisa Kulic(Gk)
- Dalibor Kalajdzic(Gk)
- Josip Djoja
- Muhammed Ali Keskin
- Boris Vukovic
- Vaso Vojnovic
- David Rajkovic
- Robert Bencun
- Djordje Miletic
- Manuel Gager
- Jakov Josic
- Arhur Vozenilek
- Alec Flogel

== Honours ==
- 2 Leagues (2007, 2010)
- 1 Cup (2008)
