= Futsal Bundesliga =

- Founded: 2021
- Country: Germany
- Confederation: German Football Association
- Number of clubs: 10
- Level on pyramid: 1
- Relegation to: Futsal-Regionalliga
- International cup: UEFA Futsal Champions League
- Current champions: TSV Weilimdorf (2025–26)
- Most championships: TSV Weilimdorf (3 titles)
- Website: https://www.dfb.de/futsal/futsal-bundesliga/start/

The Futsal Bundesliga is the highest League in the German futsal league system. The league is largely semi-professional, and the first season was played in 2021.

== History ==
The DFB has been playing a German Futsal Championship since 2006. Until 2014, the competition was called the DFB Futsal Cup, before the competition was renamed the Deutsche Futsal Meisterschaft. On the 27th September 2019, the introduction of the Futsal Bundesliga from the 2021/22 season was unanimously decided at the DFB Bundestag in Frankfurt am Main. The aim is to further promote the futsal in Germany in order to be internationally competitive.

For the opening season, the champions of the five regional leagues as well as the vice champions of the regional leagues North, Northeast, South and West qualified directly. Tenth place went to the winner of a qualifying round, in which the third-place winners of the regional leagues North, Northeast, South and West and the vice champion of the Regional League Southwest participated.

The inaugural champion was Stuttgarter FC.

== Champions ==
Season	Champion	Score	Runner-up	Losing semi-finalists
2021–22	Stuttgarter FC	2–1	HOT 05 Futsal	Hamburger SV and TSV Weilimdorf
2022–23	SSV Jahn Regensburg	4–0	HOT 05 Futsal	TSV Weilimdorf and Stuttgarter FC
2023–24	TSV Weilimdorf	2–1	HOT 05 Futsal	FC Liria Berlin and SSV Jahn Regensburg
2024–25	TSV Weilimdorf	5–1, 6–2	SSV Jahn Regensburg	Hamburger SV and HOT 05 Futsal
2025–26	TSV Weilimdorf	4–1, 4–1	HOT 05 Futsal	Hamburger SV and FC Liria Berlin

=== Performance by club ===
Club	Titles	Seasons
TSV Weilimdorf	3	2023–24, 2024–25, 2025–26
SSV Jahn Regensburg	1	2022–23
Stuttgarter FC	1	2021–22
