= Neuer (surname) =

Neuer is a surname. Notable people with the surname include:

- Hillel Neuer (born 1969 or '70), Canadian lawyer and human rights activist
- Manuel Neuer (born 1986), German football goalkeeper
- Tacks Neuer (1877–1966), American baseball player
