= Győri ETO Futsal Club =

- Full name: Győri ETO Futsal Club
- Short name: ETO
- Founded: 2006
- Ground: Magvassy Mihály Sportcsarnok, Győr
- Capacity: 2,800
- Chairman: Zoltán Drucskó
- Head Coach: Javier Rodríguez
- League: Nemzeti Bajnokság I
- 2017–2018: Nemzeti Bajnokság I, 1st
- Website: http://www.etofutsal.hu/
Home colours	Away colours	Third colours

Győri ETO Futsal Club is a Hungarian futsal club from Győr, that plays in the Nemzeti Bajnokság I.

== History ==
Founded in 2006 as Unihall FC, the team entered the second division in its inaugural year and immediately won promotion to the top division. In 2008 banking company Duna Takarék joined the club as a naming sponsor, and with their support ETO reached the NB I playoffs first time in their history. Building on that success, the team further strengthened their squad for the following year and finally went to win the title in 2010. They also collected the Hungarian cup and Hungarian supercup title, thus becoming one of the most dominant sides in the domestic futsal just in a few years.

The club ceased to exist on July 1, 2018 without a legal successor.

== Honours ==
- Nemzeti Bajnokság I:
  - Winners (8) – record: 2010, 2011, 2012, 2013, 2015, 2016, 2017, 2018
- Magyar Kupa:
  - Winners (4): 2010, 2011, 2013, 2014
- Szuperkupa:
  - Winners (4): 2010, 2011, 2012, 2013

== Team ==
=== Current squad ===
As of 17 April 2018

- 1 (Hungary) Marcell Alasztics
- 3 (Hungary) Mátyás Varjú
- 5 (Hungary) Bence Papp
- 6 (Hungary) Bence Klacsák
- 8 (Hungary) Ádám Tama
- 9 (Spain) Gerard Gonzalez Martinez
- 10 (Spain) Alejandro Constantino Viñas
- 12 (Spain) Juan Ramón Calvo Rodríguez
- 14 (Hungary) Kristóf Sáhó
- 15 (Hungary) Richárd Dávid
- 17 (Hungary) Bognár Bálint
- 66 (Hungary) Gábor Klcsó
- 69 (Hungary) Ádám Szűcs

=== Technical staff ===
- (Spain) Head Coach: Javi Rodríguez
- (Hungary) Coach: Attila Molnár
- (Hungary) Club Doctor: Jenő Szűcs, MD
- (Hungary) Masseur: Nikolett Szórádi
- (Hungary) Technical Assistant: Dóra Tillinger

=== Administrative staff ===
- (Hungary) President: Zoltán Drucskó
- (Hungary) Honorary President: Péter Bolla
- (Hungary) Sports Director: Péter Hannich
- (Hungary) Club Manager: Attila Molnár
- (Hungary) General Secretary: Henrietta Nagy
- (Hungary) General Secretary Assistant: Klaudia Madarász
- (Slovakia) Marketing Manager: Tamás Darázs
- (Hungary) Press and Webadmin: Attila Herman
