= Deutsche Futsal-Meisterschaft =

- Founded: 2006
- Country: Germany
- Confederation: German Football Association
- Number of clubs: 10
- International cup: UEFA Futsal Champions League
- Current champions: TSV Weilimdorf (2021)
- Most championships: Hamburg Panthers (4)
- Current: Current Season at UEFA.com

The Deutsche Futsal-Meisterschaft (until 2015: DFB Futsal Cup) is a futsal league in Germany that was the country's top futsal championship until 2021. It was founded in 2006. The championship which is played under UEFA rules, consists of the champion and runner-up of each Futsal-Regionalliga. Organized by German Football Association. The champion qualified for the UEFA Futsal Champions League. The top-level league for German futsal has been played in the Futsal-Bundesliga since the 2021-22 season.

== Champions ==
Season	Winner
2006	UFC Münster
2007	FV Eppelborn
2008	UFC Münster
2009	Futsal Panthers Köln
2010	SD Croatia Berlin
2011	SD Croatia Berlin
2012	Hamburg Panthers
2013	Hamburg Panthers
2014	NAFI Stuttgart
2015	Hamburg Panthers
2016	Hamburg Panthers
2017	SSV Jahn Regensburg
2018	VfL 05 Hohenstein-Ernstthal
2019	TSV Weilimdorf
2020	VfL 05 Hohenstein-Ernstthal
2021	TSV Weilimdorf
