= Hamburg Panthers =

German futsal club

HSV-Futsal
- Full name: Hamburger SV-Futsal
- Founded: 2011
- Ground: Hamburg, Germany
- Manager: (Germany) Michael Meyer
- League: DFB Futsal Bundesliga
- 2015-16: 1st
- Website: https://futsal.hsv.de/home
Home colours	Away colours

The futsal team of Hamburger SV (until 2023 HSV-Panthers, until 2017: Hamburg Panthers) is a German futsal team from Hamburg, affiliated with Hamburger SV. The team has won the German Futsal Championship four times, making them the German record champion. Additionally, the Hamburg team is a founding member of the Futsal Bundesliga.

== History ==
=== Championship title ===
Already in the premiere season 2011/2012, the Hamburg team managed to win the North German Championship and the German Futsal Championship title by defeating Futsal Panthers Cologne 4:2 in the final. The following year, the team defended the championship title with a 6:3 victory over UFC Münster.

In front of a record Futsal crowd of 2,200, the Hamburg side secured their third title in 2015 with a 7-4 win over Holzpfosten Schwerte. The Hamburgers won the fourth and currently last championship title in 2016 against Liria Berlin, becoming the record champions.

In September 2017, the Panthers joined Hamburger SV and took part in the newly created Regionalliga Nord under the current team name "HSV-Panthers". Right in their debut season, the Redshirts managed to secure the championship. At the German Futsal Championships in 2018, the HSV team failed to reach the semi-finals against the eventual title holders VfL 05 Hohenstein-Ernsttahl.

Just one year later, the HSV Panthers narrowly missed out on the title in a contested DM final when the team led by German internationals Ian-Prescott Claus, Michael Meyer, Onur Saglam and Nico Zankl were beaten 4-5 by TSV Weilimdorf from Stuttgart.

In the 2019/2020 season, the Regionalliga Nord had to be cancelled due to the development of the coronavirus. Nevertheless, eight clubs, including the HSV Panthers, competed for the title of German champions. Despite a 2:0 lead, the HSV team ultimately lost 3:5 to MCH Futsal-Club from Sennestadt. In the following season, the Red Shirts won the North German Championship and were only narrowly beaten by TSV Weilimdorf in the final for the German Championship.

In the 2021/2022 season, the Panthers finished 4th in the Bundesliga and were defeated in the semi-finals of the playoffs by the champions Stuttgarter Futsal Klub.

=== International successes ===
At international level, the Panthers took part in the Futsal Champions League for the first time in 2012, but narrowly failed in the preliminary round. The following season, however, the Hamburg team improved their performance and qualified for the main round. In 2015, the team managed to repeat this performance. The Hamburg boys achieved their greatest international success in 2016 and, after surviving the main round, entered the elite round as one of the best 16 teams in Europe. To date, no other German team has achieved this success.

=== Joining Hamburger SV (2017–2021) ===
In September 2017, the Panthers joined Hamburger SV and participated under this name in the newly created Regionalliga Nord. In their debut season, the team secured the championship and reached the semi-finals of the German Championships 2018, where they were defeated by VfL 05 Hohenstein-Ernstthal. In 2019, the Panthers successfully defended their title in northern Germany.

=== Founding member of the Bundesliga (2021-) ===
On September 3, 2021, Hamburg played the opening match of the Futsal Bundesliga against Fortuna Düsseldorf at the Castello in Düsseldorf. Fortuna won the game 1-0 with a goal from Eike Thiemann. In the regular season of the first Futsal Bundesliga, Hamburg finished in 4th place and progressed to the semi-finals in the playoffs.

The home venue for the Panthers in the Regionalliga Nord was the Sporthalle Wandsbek. Since their promotion to the Futsal Bundesliga, Hamburg has been playing together with the Wakka Eagles in the CU-Arena in Neugraben-Fischbek. In the 2022/23 season, they shared the home games between the Sporthalle Wandsbek and the CU-Arena, as they did before.

On July 13, 2023, HSV announced that the Panthers will only play under the name Hamburger SV in the future.

== Honours ==
🥇 German Futsal Champion (2012, 2013, 2015 & 2016)

🥈German runner-up (2019, 2021)

🥇North German Futsal Champion (2012, 2015, 2016, 2018, 2019, 2021)

== Players and coaches ==
Note: Flags indicate national team as defined under FIFA eligibility rules; some limited exceptions apply. Players may hold more than one non-FIFA nationality.

No.	Pos.	Nation	Player
1	GK	(Germany) GER	Deniz Altintas
2	FW	(Germany) GER	Denis Urdin
3	FW	(Germany) GER	Stefan Winkel
4	FW	(Germany) GER	Martin Schröder
5	FW	(Germany) GER	Mohamed Labiadh
6	FW	(Germany) GER	Nico Matern
7	FW	(Germany) GER	Michael Meyer

No.	Pos.	Nation	Player
8	DF	(Germany) GER	Saboor Khalili
9	FW	(Germany) GER	Erdinc Örün
10	FW	(Germany) GER	Kazim Onur Ulusoy
11	DF	(Germany) GER	Nico Zankl
13	GK	(Germany) GER	Yalcin Ceylani
14	FW	(Germany) GER	Lukas Wenzel
15	DF	(Germany) GER	Imad Mokaddem

Squad season 2016/17 at UEFA official site, (in English).
