= Futsal-Regionalliga Süd =

- Organising body: Southern German Football Association
- Founded: 2015
- Country: Germany
- Confederation: Southern German Football Association
- Number of clubs: 10
- Level on pyramid: 1
- Domestic cup: Deutsche Futsal-Meisterschaft
- International cup: UEFA Futsal Champions League
- Current champions: TSV Weilimdorf (2018–19)
- Most championships: TSV Weilimdorf (3 titles)
- Most appearances: Boris Radisavljevic (63)
- Top scorer: Josip Sesar (98 goals)
- Website: www.suedfv.de
- Current: Futsal-Regionalliga Süd 2018/19

The Futsal-Regionalliga Süd is the highest German futsal league. It consists of 10 teams and was introduced in the 2015–16 season with seven teams. The winner of each Futsal-Regionalliga takes part in the Deutsche Futsal-Meisterschaft to determine the German champion at the end of the season. The second-placed team has the chance to qualify for the Deutsche Futsal-Meisterschaft through a playoff round. The bottom teams of the Regionalliga are relegated directly or compete in a relegation playoff round. The Futsal-Regionalliga Süd is organised by the Southern German Football Association and includes the Federal States of Bavaria, Hessia and Baden-Wurttemberg.

== Founding members of the Futsal-Regionalliga Süd 2015/16 ==
SV Darmstadt 98, Cosmos Hoechst, BaKi Futsal Nuremberg, Germania Ober-Roden, FC Portus Pforzheim, TV Wackersdorf, TSV Weilimdorf

== Champions of the Futsal-Regionalliga Süd ==
Year	Champions	Runners-up	Third place	Fourth place
2016	TSV Weilimdorf	FC Portus Pforzheim	TV Wackersdorf	SV Darmstadt 98
2017	SSV Jahn Regensburg	TSV Weilimdorf	FC Portus Pforzheim	TV Wackersdorf
2018	TSV Weilimdorf	SSV Jahn Regensburg	FC Deisenhofen	BaKi Futsal Nürnberg
2019	TSV Weilimdorf	SSV Jahn Regensburg	FC Deisenhofen	TV Wackersdorf

== Records ==
=== Player records ===
As of 1 July 2019

Boris Radisavljevic is the league's record player with 63 caps only for TV Wackersdorf. The top goalscorer is Josip Sesar with 98 goals only for TSV Weilimdorf.

=== Team records ===
As of 1 July 2019

TSV Weilimdorf were crowned the first champions. The most league titles (3) have been won and the most wins (59) have been recorded by TSV Weilimdorf. SSV Jahn Regensburg and TSV Weilimdorf are the league's onlyest teams to end a season undefeated, have won the Deutsche Futsal-Meisterschaft and to qualify for the UEFA Futsal Champions League.

== See also ==
- Deutsche Futsal-Meisterschaft
- UEFA Futsal Champions League
