= 2012 in Ireland =

- Centuries: 19th; 20th; 21st
- Decades: 1990s; 2000s; 2010s; 2020s
- See also: 2012 in Northern Ireland; Other events of 2012; List of years in Ireland

Events during the year 2012 in Ireland.

== Incumbents ==
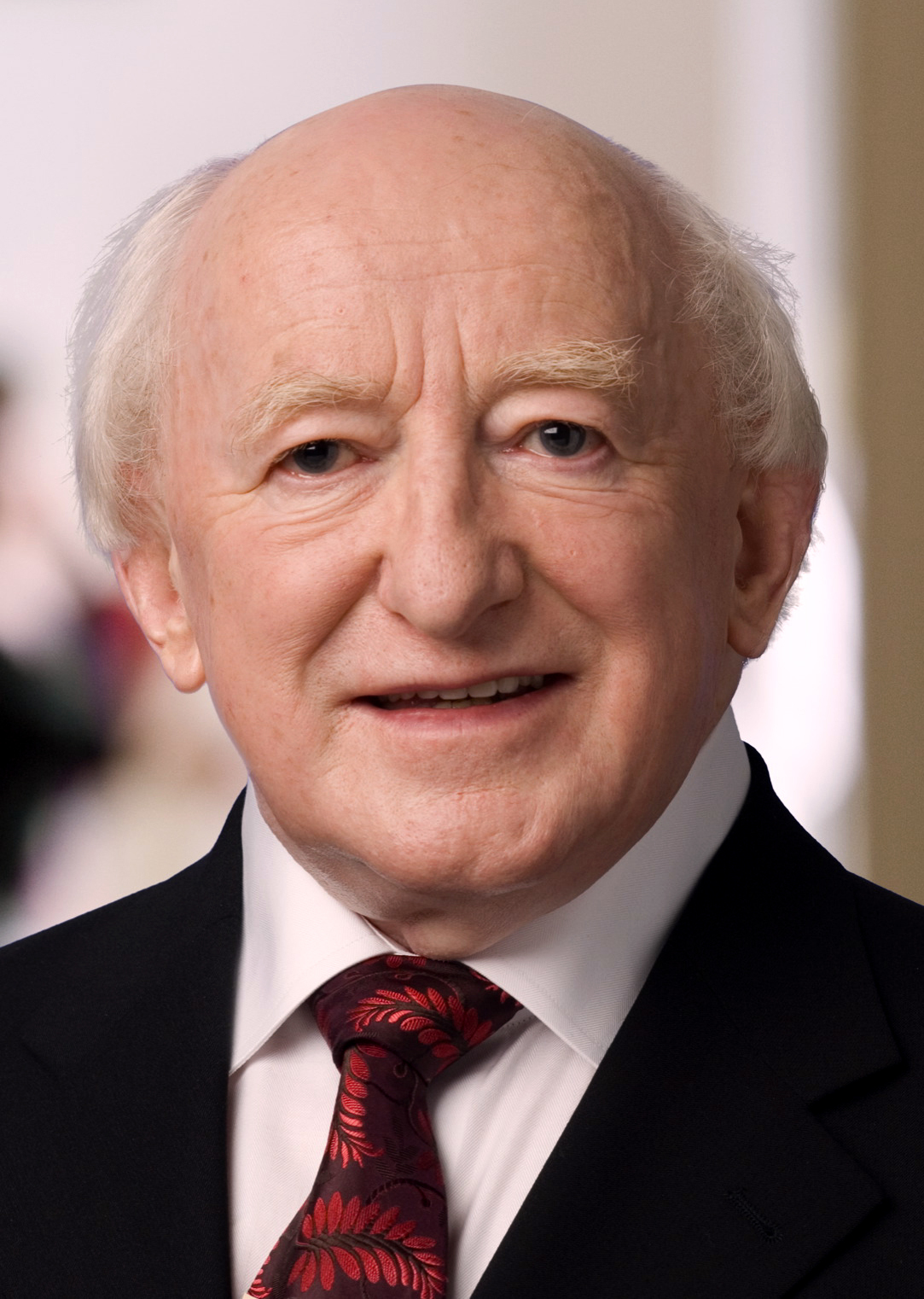
President Michael D. Higgins

- President: Michael D. Higgins
- Taoiseach: Enda Kenny (FG)
- Tánaiste: Eamon Gilmore (Lab)
- Minister for Finance: Michael Noonan (FG)
- Chief Justice: Susan Denham
- Dáil: 31st
- Seanad: 24th

== Events ==
=== January ===
- The occupation of the Vita Cortex plant in Cork, which closed in December, continued into the new year.
- 1 January – The Government stopped paying expenses to former taoisigh (prime ministers), while sweeping price increases for goods and services, and in value added tax (VAT), affected consumers when decisions announced in Budget 2012 came into effect. A controversial €100 household charge was applied, as were large increases in transport fares, motor taxation, and health insurance costs.
- 3 January
  - A large fireball was seen across Ireland. Astronomy Ireland calculated that it landed as a meteorite in the Irish Sea off County Louth.
  - A new €2 coin was issued by the Central Bank of Ireland as it celebrated ten years of the euro.
  - Occupy Cork: The NAMA-listed Stapleton House on Oliver Plunkett Street was occupied in the city.
- 8 January – Fine Gael politician and RTÉ broadcaster Barry O'Neill was involved in controversy when photographs appeared on Facebook of his new wife giving Nazi salutes beside models of Adolf Hitler and other Nazis during their European honeymoon.
- 12 January – Ulster Bank announced plans to cut 950 jobs from its Irish operations by the end of the year, with around 600 to be cut in the Republic of Ireland.
- 13 January – The Criminal Law (Defence and the Dwelling) Act 2012, drafted after the 2004 death of John Ward, came into effect. The new home defence law allowed householders to defend their homes against intruders using reasonable force, including deadly force.
- 15 January – A fatal fishing disaster occurred off the south west coast. Three bodies were later found; two others remain missing.
- 16 January
  - Seán Quinn, Ireland's richest person as recently as 2008, was declared bankrupt at the High Court.
  - Proinsias De Rossa resigned as Member of the European Parliament for the Dublin constituency, to be replaced by Emer Costello.
- 22–3 January – A strong solar proton storm created a rare display of the aurora borealis in Ireland that was observed by thousands of people in north County Donegal, and as far south as Charlestown, County Mayo.
- 24 January – Debt campaigners dressed as zombies converged on the Irish embassy in Britain to highlight the presence of zombie banks such as the Irish Bank Resolution Corporation (formerly Anglo Irish Bank).
- 25 January
  - Ireland paid another €1.25 billion to Anglo Irish Bank bondholders against the wishes of Irish people.
  - Protesters travelled from Galway to Dublin to rally outside Leinster House against the septic tank charge being brought in by the Fine Gael/Labour coalition.
  - The websites of the Departments of Justice and Finance were disabled by a denial-of-service attack.
  - The Office of the Data Protection Commission wrote to Dublin City Council about its giving the personal details of 140,000 customers to a private waste company called Greyhound.
- 26 January
  - An earthquake classified as minor (magnitude 2.2) struck County Donegal.
  - Dublin officially began its term as the European City of Science 2012.
  - Dáil Éireann passed the Water Services Amendment Bill, allowing the government to charge rural dwellers for their septic tanks, as well as to inspect them.
  - Taoiseach Enda Kenny, at the World Economic Forum in Davos, told the world that Irish people "went mad borrowing" from a banking system that spawned greed.
  - The High Court was told that 11 gardaí were investigating sinister goings-on at Anglo Irish Bank; Mr. Justice Peter Kelly called the revelation "extraordinary".

=== February ===
- 1 and 2 February – Jimmy Harte, a Labour Senator, was involved in controversy over contributions to a misleading story in the Irish Independent on a Polish woman's account of living in Ireland, and subsequent comments on Twitter, which he later withdrew.
- 6 February – Workers at Galway Airport staged a sit-in to protest at the failure by management to guarantee that they will receive redundancy payments when their contracts expire.
- 10 February – Eircom admitted that personal details of thousands of eMobile and Meteor customers and hundreds of Meteor staff were contained on three laptops stolen in December 2011.
- 11 February – One of the largest protest marches in Cork city in recent years took place in solidarity with the Vita Cortex sit-in.
- 16 February – Barry Doyle was convicted of the November 2008 murder of Shane Geoghegan.
- 18 February – Chinese vice-president Xi Jinping began a three-day trip to Ireland.
- 20 February – In "scenes reminiscent of the land wars of the 18th century", a group of housing activists and Joan Collins TD successfully prevented an attempted eviction by the deputy sheriff of a man from his home on Mountrath, County Laois.
- 21 February – President Michael D. Higgins began his first official trip abroad when he went to London for three days, accompanied by his wife, Sabina. He met members of the Irish community and Irish emigrant welfare workers at the London Irish Centre in Camden, and later met London-based Irish business and cultural leaders. He toured the Olympic Stadium, undergoing construction, addressed the London School of Economics in a speech entitled, Of Public Intellectuals, Universities, and a Democratic Crisis, and attended a production of Seán O'Casey's play Juno and the Paycock by Dublin's Abbey Theatre and the Royal National Theatre of Great Britain (Lyttelton Theatre). He also attended a reception at the Irish Embassy.
- 28 February – The taoiseach announced a referendum to be held on the Fiscal Compact.
- 29 February
  - Dozens of community groups from counties Donegal, Tipperary, Galway, Limerick and Kerry went to Leinster House to protest against austerity.
  - Éamon Ó Cuív was sacked as Deputy Leader of Fianna Fáil and Communications Spokesperson of the party after a row with leader Micheál Martin over the Fiscal Compact referendum.
  - Minister of State Seán Sherlock signed into law a statutory instrument to amend Ireland's copyright legislation in spite of 80,000 signatures being gathered to oppose the move.

=== March ===
- 7 March – The Broadcasting Authority of Ireland upheld a complaint against broadcaster RTÉ made by Seán Gallagher relating to the broadcast of an erroneous tweet that unbalanced a television debate during his presidential campaign.
- 8 March
  - The Garda Síochána destroyed the Occupy Dame Street camp in an overnight raid.
  - Allied Irish Banks (AIB) confirmed a plan to cut 2,500 jobs.
- 9 March – Waterford City Council dismantled the Occupy Waterford campsite.
- 13 March – County Donegal was struck by a magnitude 1.1 earthquake.
- 14 March – The Government was defeated in a vote taken at a meeting of the Oireachtas finance committee after numerous Fine Gael TDs went missing. The motion, tabled by Peter Mathews who was then forced to vote against it following threats from his colleagues, proposed that Central Bank Governor Patrick Honohan be forced to appear before the Oireachtas finance committee by the end of the month.
- 15 March – A convicted Garda killer escaped from prison leading to a massive cross-border manhunt.
- 18 March – Environment Minister Phil Hogan was involved in controversy over media reports on a crude sexual insult he admitted delivering to ex-Taoiseach John Bruton's former administrator at an Oireachtas golf outing in August 2011.
- 22 March
  - The Mahon Tribunal published it findings after 15 years of investigations.
  - The Central Statistics Office published figures that showed Ireland had fallen back into recession in the final quarter of 2011, following an even larger contraction in the previous one.
- 24 March
  - Thousands of people packed to capacity the National Stadium in Dublin for a national rally to protest the household charge payment introduced in the last Budget. Crowds of people unable to get in gathered outside.
  - Facing expulsion from the Fianna Fáil party, Bertie Ahern resigned before he could be ousted.
- 25 March – Taoiseach Enda Kenny began a four-day trade mission in China.
- 26 March – Facing expulsion, Pádraig Flynn resigned from Fianna Fáil before he could be ousted.
- 27 March
  - Tánaiste Eamon Gilmore announced the date of the referendum on the fiscal compact as Thursday 31 May.
  - Video games retail company Game closed 277 shops with the loss of 2,104 jobs. Staff began a sit-in.
- 29 March – The latest census results report from the 2011 Census were released by the Central Statistics Office Ireland.
- 31 March – Ireland was reported by international media to be facing a popular revolt after government figures indicated less than half of the country's households had paid the new property tax by that day's deadline as thousands of people from across the country marched on the governing Fine Gael party's annual conference at the Convention Centre Dublin.

=== April ===
- 2 April – Female genital mutilation was made illegal by the enactment by President Higgins of the Criminal Justice (Female Genital Mutilation) Act 2012.
- 3 April
  - It emerged that six people had died at a private nursing home in County Donegal over the previous ten days.
  - RTÉ's defamation of Father Kevin Reynolds: RTÉ head of current affairs Ed Mulhall retired, Ken O'Shea resigned from Prime Time and the programme was terminated.
- 5 April – The majority of shareholders in support services company Siteserv voted to accept a takeover proposal from the Denis O'Brien-controlled Millington, worth €45 million. The controversial deal came after French company Altrad claimed it had tried to buy Siteserv for a higher price.
- 11 April – Environment Minister Phil Hogan sought sanctuary in a Carlow cathedral after running away from protesters against his property tax in his own constituency.
- 14 April – As the Labour Party held its centenary conference at the National University of Ireland, Galway, gardaí used pepper spray to hold back anti-austerity demonstrators protesting against government cuts on the grounds, with reports of a 13-year-old child being threatened with the spray as the building was locked down amid chants of "Revolution, revolution!" and a coffin draped in the Irish tricolour.
- 17 April – Environment Minister Phil Hogan announced the establishment of Irish Water, as a subsidiary of Bord Gáis.
- 19 April
  - Gavin O'Reilly, chief executive of Independent News & Media, resigned after a long-running dispute with Denis O'Brien, the company's biggest shareholder.
  - Sinn Féin's Pearse Doherty was expelled from the Dáil after trying to question the appointment of a new Secretary General at the Department of Finance.
  - A report commissioned by the Department of Health found significant increase in narcolepsy among individuals given the GlaxoSmithKline developed swine flu vaccine Pandemrix compared to those who did not receive the vaccine.
- 24 April
  - The Garda Síochána Ombudsman Commission ruled that there were no grounds for any criminal case against any of five officers involved in an incident on 31 March 2011 known as the "rape tape" controversy, resulting from the inadvertent video recording of a sergeant in a patrol car joking about the rape of two women.
  - The aurora borealis returned to County Donegal, having already made a rare Irish appearance in January.
- 25 April – A tornado was observed near Fintown in County Donegal.

=== May ===
- 2 May – Cardinal Seán Brady was embroiled in controversy over a BBC television programme which contained allegations that he failed to act after one sex abuse survivor gave him a list in 1975 of other children being abused by Father Brendan Smyth.
- 4 May – RTÉ's defamation of Father Kevin Reynolds: RTÉ was fined €2,000,000 by the Broadcasting Authority of Ireland (BAI). Reporter Aoife Kavanagh resigned from RTÉ over her role in the scandal.
- 9 May
  - The Abbey Theatre announced a nine-week closure when asbestos was discovered in the building.
  - Archaeologists announced discovery in the Burren of evidence of settlement from 6000 BCE.
- 11 May – President Higgins received the Freedom of Galway from Mayor Hildegarde Naughton.
- 14 May – While canvassing for votes in Athlone, Taoiseach Enda Kenny told an unemployed bus driver to "get a job". The man later requested an apology and retraction, calling Kenny "a smug, arrogant git". In the same town, Kenny had an angry exchange with a man who said his son had been forced to emigrate.
- 16 May – The Garda Síochána destroyed the Occupy Galway camp in an overnight raid.
- 17 May
  - Taoiseach Enda Kenny was heckled and booed by anti-austerity treaty protesters in Galway as he attended a breakfast briefing.
  - Financial irregularities were revealed at Bloxham Stockbrokers.
  - Following the UN Committee Against Torture's condemnation of the Irish government's failure to acknowledge and assist former detainees of the ten Catholic-run Magdalene laundries, the Justice for Magdalenes campaign group announced its discovery that women were transferred from State-funded mother and baby homes to Magdalene laundries, where they were held against their will and without their children.
- 31 May – Voters passed the constitutional referendum to permit Ireland to ratify the 2012 European Fiscal Compact.

=== June ===
- 5 June – Hundreds of Bord na Móna workers went on strike in a dispute over pay.
- 6 June – The second-largest earthquake on record in Britain or Ireland, an offshore magnitude 4 tremor west of Belmullet, shook the counties of Mayo, Sligo, and Galway.
- 7 June – Former members of the Defence Forces demonstrated in Dublin over malaria medication they were given on overseas peacekeeping duties which they say has caused them chronic health problems.
- 10–17 June – The 50th International Eucharistic Congress took place at the RDS and Croke Park in Dublin. Protesters picketed.
- 11 June – A tornado 700 metres high was seen near Buncrana in County Donegal, one of the biggest ever recorded in Ireland.
- 13 June – Justice Minister Alan Shatter spoke of "Londonderry" in a Dáil debate. There were calls for him to resign his office amid the ensuing controversy.
- 17 June – Pope Benedict XVI delivered a pre-recorded address about the sex abuse scandal on the final day of the 50th Eucharistic Congress.
- 18 June – Burmese opposition leader Aung San Suu Kyi paid a six-hour flying visit to Dublin on the day before her 67th birthday. She was received by President Higgins during a 20-minute visit to Áras an Uachtaráin and was awarded an honorary degree from Trinity College Dublin. She also received the Freedom of the City of Dublin, which was awarded in 2000. At an "Electric Burma" concert at the Bord Gáis Energy Theatre, she was presented with the Amnesty Ambassador of Conscience Award which had been awarded to her in 2009, and a large crowd sang the birthday song to her at a free open-air concert at Grand Canal Dock.
- Statement from Áras an Uachtaráin on the occasion of the visit of Daw Aung San Suu Kyi Áras an Uachtaráin, 18 June 2012.
- Burma's Aung San Suu Kyi leaves Ireland after awards RTÉ News, 2012-06-18.
- Aung San Suu Kyi gets freedom of Dublin BBC News, 2012-06-18.
- "Thousands pay tribute to Burma's 'last great hope'". The Irish Times. 19 June 2012. Archived from the original on 5 November 2013 – via HighBeam Research.
- 20 June – An independent review into the deaths of children who were in the care of, or who were known to the Health Service Executive (HSE), was published. The following day, Tánaiste Eamon Gilmore stated in the Dáil that a referendum on the rights of the child would be held in the autumn.
- 21 June – Turf cutters staged an overnight protest on a bog in County Galway.
- Crisis at Ulster Bank:
  - 21 June – More than 100,000 people, including social welfare recipients, were left impoverished after being affected by an Ulster Bank delay in processing money.
  - 24 June – Ulster Bank opened branches on a Sunday for the first time as the payments crisis affecting the institution continued unabated.
  - 25 June – Ulster Bank announced its money problems would not now be solved this week, with monthly salaries now in danger of being infected.
- 23 June – President Higgins made his second official visit to London with his wife, Sabina. They met members of the Irish community at a Gaelic Athletic Association club in Ruislip and later attended the official opening of three plays by Tom Murphy on the theme of Irish emigration (Conversations on a Homecoming, A Whistle in the Dark, and Famine) in a Druid Theatre Company production at Hampstead Theatre.
- 27 June – President and Mrs. Higgins attended a Co-operation Ireland event at the Lyric Theatre in Belfast. There, they met Queen Elizabeth for the first time and were present to witness the first meeting and handshake between the Queen and former IRA commander, Martin McGuinness.

=== July ===
- 10 July – Health Minister James Reilly was named on a debt defaulters' list to the tune of €1.9 million. This was described as "unprecedented" for a government minister.
- 13 July – It was revealed that Fine Gael Senator Fidelma Healy Eames boarded the Galway to Dublin train without a ticket. A fellow passenger alleged that Healy Eames said "she is a Senator and that she makes the law" when an inspector asked her to produce her ticket.
- 18 July – Former TV3 News Western Correspondent Jenny McCudden was named as the new editor of The Sligo Champion, becoming the first female to fill the position in the newspaper's 176-year history.
- 26 July – Galway Circuit Civil Court ordered the husband of Fidelma Healy Eames to pay more than €12,000 in unpaid fees to a tradesman employed to carry out renovations at the Healy Eames residence in County Galway. The tradesman launched a lawsuit in 2010 against the Healy Eameses for thousands of euros in unpaid fees.
- 27 July – During a case at Claremorris District Court Judge Mary Devins, wife of former Fianna Fáil TD Jimmy Devins, described social welfare as a Polish charity, sparking national outrage and a formal complaint to the police over "the possibility that she is in breach of the prohibition in the Incitement to Hatred Act from 1989".

=== August ===
- 2 August – It was confirmed that a car belonging to Fidelma Healy Eames was seized in July for not having a current tax disc.
- 15 August – Geraldine Kennedy and Justine McCarthy were appointed Adjunct Professors of Journalism at the University of Limerick.
- 17 August – Staff at Letterkenny General Hospital were informed of the closure of County Donegal's only gynaecology ward. Nursing unions, patients and staff reacted with shock to the news.
- 20 August
  - Three investigations into a nursing home in Oughterard, County Galway, found most residents had not washed for at least a month, were being starved and lived in squalid conditions.
  - Fidelma Healy Eames was involved in controversy over her decision to charge a state agency the cost of a plane ticket for her husband to accompany her on a hotel break to Kenya. When news of this was reported in the Irish media, Healy Eames said she would pay back the money within "a couple of weeks".
- 22 August – On the 90th anniversary of the death of revolutionary Michael Collins, the Taoiseach Enda Kenny gave the commemoration speech at Béal na Bláth, the first serving head of government to do so. He also erroneously credited Collins with bringing Vladimir Lenin to Ireland.
- 24 August – Journalist Charlie Bird informed RTÉ management of his retirement.
- 27 August – The board of Independent News & Media elected Cork businessman Leslie Buckley, a close associate of Denis O'Brien, as its new chairman, replacing James Osborne who was ousted in April.
- 28 August
  - Amateur astronomer David Grennan discovered his second supernova from his observatory in Raheny two years after he discovered his first one. He is the only one ever to have discovered supernovae from Ireland.
  - Hundreds of jobs were lost when College Freight, operating as Target Express, the country's largest privately owned transport company, announced it had ceased trading. Workers began sit-ins in Carlow, Cork and Limerick.

=== September ===
- 3 September
  - The Fianna Fáil and Sinn Féin parties tabled a motion of no confidence in the Minister for Health James Reilly after further cuts in the health service.
  - Dublin City Council voted overwhelmingly in favour of full marriage rights for same-sex couples. Bill Tormey, a Fine Gael councillor, caused an uproar after claiming it was impossible to equate homosexual unions with heterosexual ones, as well as claiming that only heterosexual couples were capable of producing children.
- 4 September – The Health Service Executive (HSE) confirmed it was cutting 16,000 requests per month for the gluten-free products that are required by sufferers of coeliac disease.
- 7 September – Stephen Rae was appointed as editor of the Irish Independent newspaper.
- 8 September – A volley of shots was fired as hundreds of people attended the funeral in Dublin of Real IRA dissident Alan Ryan.
- 11 September
  - District Court judge Séamus Hughes was criticised and asked to resign over comments on the ethnic backgrounds of those before him in court, having described some as "neanderthals".
  - Michael Hegarty, a Fine Gael councillor, resigned as chairman of County Cork's Joint Policing Committee and as leader of Fine Gael on Cork County Council due to a drink-driving charge related to a road traffic incident.
- 15 September – The Irish Daily Star newspaper published topless photographs of Kate Middleton. The editor Michael O'Kane defended the publication. Media boss Richard Desmond announced his intention to close down the tabloid. O'Kane was later suspended.
- 17 September – Clerys, one of Ireland's best known department stores, was put into receivership.
- 21 September – A spectacular breaking fireball strewed a trail of burning fragments across the night sky in Ireland, and was seen also in Britain and the Netherlands.
- 22 September – Taoiseach Enda Kenny met Pope Benedict XVI for the first time since criticising him in the Dáil. The meeting occurred at the Papal residence, Castel Gandolfo.
- 26 September – Róisín Shortall resigned as Minister of State for Primary Care due to a dispute with Minister for Health James Reilly, the deputy leader of Fine Gael. She also resigned from the Labour Party.
- 30 September – Dolphin Discs, a record shop on Talbot Street in Dublin that had existed since the early 1970s, closed as a result of the loss of business due to the rise of digital downloads; "as much as (a) 40% (loss) in the past three years".

=== October ===
- 9 October
  - Thousands of farmers marched through Dublin city in protest at government cuts.
  - A walkout occurred during a Public Accounts Committee meeting with the Health Service Executive when health officials were told they were not fit for office.
- 16 October – A report on St. Patrick's Institution found a culture of human rights abuse.

=== November ===
- 5 November – Students marched against austerity in Cork.
- 8 November
  - Two days ahead of the children's referendum, the Supreme Court – ruling against the government's distribution of information on the referendum – found the government had breached the 1995 McKenna judgement requiring that referendums be explained to the public in an unbiased manner. The referendum's website was immediately taken down.
  - Barry Andrews, the former Fianna Fáil Minister of State for Children, was appointed chief executive of aid charity GOAL, replacing John O'Shea.
- 10 November
  - The Irish children's rights referendum was passed by a majority of 58 percent, with a turnout of 33.5 percent.
  - Thousands of people marched against austerity in Waterford, the largest such event in the city for decades.
- 13 November – The death of Savita Halappanavar on 28 October at a Galway hospital became public.
- 14 November
  - Students in Galway marched against college fee increases and carried a coffin to the constituency office of Labour TD Derek Nolan.
  - Union of Students in Ireland President John Logue was arrested and charged with breach of the peace for standing with his back to deputies in Dáil Éireann.
- 24 November
  - Ten thousand people marched against austerity in Dublin, amid calls for a general strike to shut down the country.
  - Irish Daily Star editor Michael O'Kane resigned over his role in the publication of topless photographs of Kate Middleton.
- 28 November
  - Students marched through Letterkenny, and distributed a thousand letters of protest to the office of their local government (Fine Gael) TD, Joe McHugh.
  - An X Case Bill, which proposed legislating for abortion in the event of risk to a woman's life, was defeated by 101–27 in the Dáil.

=== December ===
- 4 December – Independent politician Mattie McGrath took part in a sit-in at the offices of Friends First Finance in support of a farmer being pursued by the financial institution. TDs Michael McCarthy (Labour), Tom Hayes and Patrick O'Donovan (both of Fine Gael) and Michael Moynihan and Dara Calleary (both of Fianna Fáil), while seated in the Dáil bar, made a hoax call to Mattie McGrath pretending they were a pizza restaurant, offering free pizza to those partaking in the sit-in.
- 5 December – The Budget was announced for 2013.
- 13 December – Labour Party chairman Colm Keaveney voted against the Social Welfare Bill and was expelled from the parliamentary party.

== The arts ==
=== Architecture ===
- 20 April – Belfast Metropolitan Arts Centre (MAC), designed by Hackett Hall McKnight, was opened in Northern Ireland.
- 3 July – Giant's Causeway Visitors' Centre, designed by Heneghan Peng for the National Trust, was opened in Northern Ireland.
- University of Limerick Medical School, designed by Grafton Architects, was opened.

=== Film ===
- 26 January – A video on demand service called Volta was launched by Arts Minister Jimmy Deenihan.
- February – The Guard won The Guardian's annual First Film award.
- 11 February – 9th Irish Film and Television Awards.
- 5 October – What Richard Did was released.

=== Literature ===
- 1 January – Copyright restrictions on James Joyce's major works were lifted.
- February – James Joyce's children's story The Cats of Copenhagen was published for the first time by Ithys Press in Dublin.
- February – A new book of poetry by President Higgins was strongly criticised by Professor Kevin Kiely, who said the President of Ireland "can be accused of crimes against literature".
- March – An Hobad, a translation of The Hobbit into Irish, went on sale.
- 10 April – The National Library of Ireland published its holdings of James Joyce manuscripts cost-free online.
- 17 April – Anne Enright's The Forgotten Waltz was shortlisted for the Orange Prize for Fiction.
- 10 June – Peruvian writer Mario Vargas Llosa visited Ireland. He spoke at the Dublin Writers' Festival and at the Instituto Cervantes about his novel about Roger Casement, El sueño del celta, newly translated into English as The Dream of the Celt.
- 21 September – On Culture Night, a rare collection of James Joyce's poetry was displayed at the National University of Ireland, Galway.
- October – Donal Ryan's novel The Spinning Heart was published.
- 8 November – Maeve Binchy's last novel, A Week in Winter, was published posthumously.
- 13 November – Colm Tóibín's short novel The Testament of Mary was published.
- Claire Kilroy's novel The Devil I Know was published.

=== Theatre ===
- May – A new Smock Alley Theatre opened in Dublin.

== Sport ==
=== Association football ===
- 12 October – Pressure increased on Giovanni Trapattoni after Ireland lost 6–1 to Germany in 2014 FIFA World Cup qualification – UEFA Group C, their joint worst ever competitive defeat and their worst home defeat since 1931.

Euro 2012

- 10 June – Ireland 1–3 Croatia.
- 14 June – Spain 4–0 Ireland.
- 18 June – Italy 2–0 Ireland.

Friendly international matches

- 29 February – Ireland 1–1 Czech Republic.
- 26 May – Ireland 1–0 Bosnia and Herzegovina.
- 4 June – Hungary 0–0 Ireland.
- 15 August – Serbia 0–0 Ireland.
- 11 September – Ireland 4–1 Oman.
- 14 November – Ireland 0–1 Greece.

League of Ireland

- 2 March – League begins.
- 6 August – Gardaí investigated the alleged throwing of bananas at Gaël Clichy in Limerick.
- 28 October – League ends.
- 4 November – FAI Cup Final.

World Cup 2014 qualifiers

- 7 September – Kazakhstan 1–2 Ireland.
- 12 October – Ireland 1–6 Germany.
- 16 October – Faroe Islands 1–4 Ireland.

=== Boxing ===
- 19 May – Katie Taylor won a fourth successive World Amateur Championship, beating Russian Sofya Ochigava.

=== Gaelic games ===
Camogie

- 9 September – Wexford Camogie teams beat Cork in the All-Ireland Final to claim a three-in-a-row title.

Football

- 23 September – All-Ireland football final – Donegal 2–11, Mayo 0–13.

Hurling

- All-Ireland hurling final – Galway 2–13, Kilkenny 0–19 on 9 September.
- All-Ireland hurling final replay – Galway 3–11, Kilkenny 3–22 on 30 September.

=== Summer Olympics ===
- 11 January – Kieran Behan became the second gymnast representing Ireland to qualify for an Olympic Games, despite expectation that he would never walk again.
- 6 June – The Olympic torch toured Dublin.
- 27 July – Katie Taylor bore the flag for Ireland at the 2012 Summer Olympics opening ceremony.
- 31 July – Glandular fever forced Gráinne Murphy out of the Olympics.
- 5 August – Team Ireland won its first Olympic medal of the 2012 Summer Olympics as John Joe Nevin defeated Mexico's Óscar Valdez in his bantamweight division quarter-final bout, to guarantee himself at least a bronze medal.
- 6 August – Katie Taylor won her quarter-final bout against Team GB's Natasha Jonas, and guaranteed herself at least a bronze medal. Fans produced record noise levels.
- 6 August – Annalise Murphy missed out on a medal after finishing in fourth place in her sailing event at Weymouth, Dorset.
- 7 August – Michael Conlan won his quarter-final bout against France's Nordine Oubaali, and guaranteed himself at least a bronze medal.
- 8 August –
  - Katie Taylor won her semi-final bout against Tajikistan's Mavzuna Chorieva, and guaranteed herself at least a silver medal.
  - Cian O'Connor won a bronze medal with his horse Blue Loyd 12 at individual jumping.
  - Paddy Barnes won his quarter-final bout against India's Devendro Singh, and guaranteed himself at least a bronze medal. In doing so, he became the first Irish boxer to win medals at two Olympic Games.
- 9 August – Katie Taylor won her final bout against Russia's Sofya Ochigava, securing Olympic Gold.
- 10 August –
  - Paddy Barnes lost his semi-final bout against China's Zou Shiming.
  - John Joe Nevin won his semi-final bout against Cuba's Lázaro Álvarez, and guaranteed himself at least a silver medal.
  - Michael Conlan lost his semi-final bout against Cuba's Robeisy Ramírez.
- 11 August –
  - Robert Heffernan missed out on a medal after finishing the men's 50 kilometres walk in fourth place. Brendan Boyce finished in 29th place. Colin Griffin was disqualified.
  - John Joe Nevin lost his final bout against Team GB's Luke Campbell, and was deprived of a gold medal.
- 13 August – Team Ireland arrived home.

=== Rugby union ===
Heineken Cup

- 20 January – Connacht defeated Harlequins at the Galway Sportsgrounds to claim their first ever victory in the Heineken Cup, though they came bottom of the table in Group 6.

Six Nations

- 4 February – Ireland 21–23 Wales
- 25 February – Ireland 42-10 Italy
- 4 March – France 17-17 Ireland.
- 10 March – Ireland 32-14 Scotland
- 17 March – England 30-9 Ireland

=== Running ===
- 6 February – In Sydney, Richard Donovan from Galway completed seven marathons in 4 days, 22 hours, 3 minutes.

== Deaths ==
=== January ===
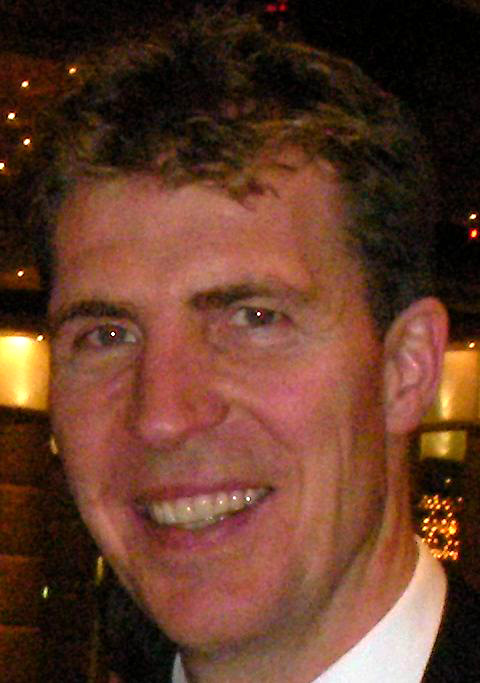
Jim Stynes

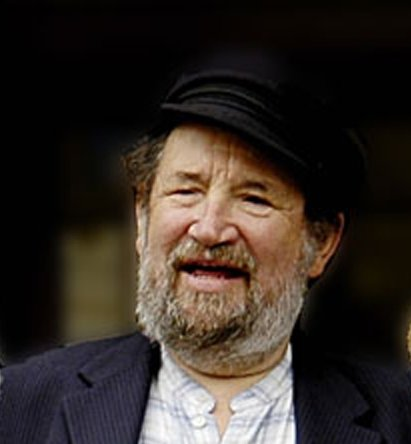
Barney McKenna

- 9 January – Bridie Gallagher, 87: ballad singer, from natural causes.
- 10 January
  - John McCarthy, 61: mental health campaigner, as a result of motor neuron disease.
  - Mary Raftery, 54: journalist, after an illness.
- 11 January – Colm Tucker, 59: former rugby union player, after a short illness.
- 15 January – Pearse Hutchinson, 84: writer and broadcaster.
- 17 January – Aengus Fanning, 69: journalist and editor of the Sunday Independent, cancer.
- 22 January – Paddy Martin, 88: international boxer and father of Micheál Martin, long illness.

=== February ===
- 6 February – Noel Kelehan, 76: renowned conductor, jazz pianist, arranger and composer, long illness.
- 7 February – Phil Shanahan, 84: former Tipperary and Dublin hurler, heart condition.
- 8 February – John Cunningham, 66: journalist and editor of the Connacht Tribune (1984–2007), illness.
- 9 February
  - Emer Í Chuív, 93: last surviving daughter of Éamon de Valera and mother of Éamon Ó Cuív.
  - Gerry Hickey, 67: former programme adviser to Bertie Ahern, cancer.
- 12 February –
  - David Kelly, 82: stage, film and television actor, short illness.
  - Gerry O'Sullivan, 65: consultant surgeon and founder of the Cork Cancer Research Centre, short illness.
- 13 February – Eamon Deacy, 53: former Aston Villa footballer, heart attack.
- 14 February – Kieran Finlay: former Monaghan Gaelic footballer, long illness.
- 18 February
  - Bertie Messitt, 81: former Olympic athlete, long illness.
  - Quentin Doran-O'Reilly: equestrian journalist, illness.
- 19 February – Ann Comerford-Phelan: former Cork camogie player and All-Ireland-winning captain, short illness.
- 21 February – Máirín Egan, 87: lobbyist and founding member of the Society of Autistic Children.
- 22 February – Frank Carson, 85: comedian and actor, stomach cancer.
- 23 February – Florence Noonan, 68: wife of Minister for Finance Michael Noonan, pneumonia.
- 26 February – Jack Bourke, 80: former Mayor of Limerick, long illness.
- 28 February – Hal Roache, 84: comedian.

=== March ===
- 2 March – Louis O'Carroll, 62: psychiatrist and balladeer, car accident.
- 20 March – Jim Stynes, 45: Dublin minor footballer and Aussie rules star, cancer.
- 26 March – Michael Begley, 79: former Fine Gael TD for Kerry South, long illness.
- 28 March – John Arden, 81: English playwright who lived and died in Galway.
- 29 March – Cyril Fitzgerald, 72: rugby union administrator, illness.
- 31 March – Michael Diskin, 49: theatre administrator, long illness.

=== April ===
- 1 April – Louis Kilcoyne: former president of the Football Association of Ireland.
- 5 April – Barney McKenna, 72: folk musician and founding member of the Dubliners.
- 6 April – Dermot Hanafin, 84: former Kerry Gaelic footballer.
- 7 April – John Egan, 59: former Kerry Gaelic footballer, heart condition.
- 25 April – Louis le Brocquy, 95: artist, following a long illness.
- 25 April – Jim Downing, 66: former Cork Gaelic footballer, unexpectedly.

=== May ===
- 6 May – Neilli Mulcahy, 87: fashion designer, short illness.
- 20 May – Geoffrey Evans, 69: serial killer, illness.

=== June ===
- 1 June – Pádraig Faulkner, 94: former primary school teacher, Fianna Fáil government minister and Ceann Comhairle.
- 30 June – Richard Booth, 57: former chairman of both the IFA National Livestock Committee and the EU Beef Advisory Committee.

=== July ===
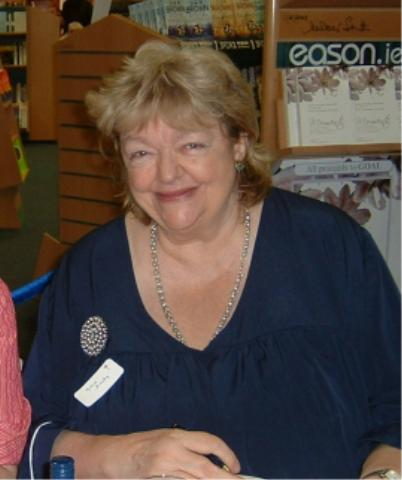
Maeve Binchy

- 28 July – Peter Evans-Freke, 11th Baron Carbery, 92, Anglo-Irish peer
- 30 July – Maeve Binchy, 72: novelist, columnist and speaker, short illness.

=== August ===
- 2 August – Olive Corcoran, 54: champion rower.
- 4 August – Con Houlihan, 86: sports journalist.
- 8 August – John O'Mahony, 75: former Cork Gaelic footballer, long illness.
- 24 August – Maureen Toal, 81: actress best known for her role as Teasy McDaid in Glenroe.

=== September ===
- 1 September – David Charlton, 48: Garda and husband of former Tánaiste Mary Coughlan, cancer.
- 7 September – Gerry Culliton, 76: rugby player.
- 13 September – Brian Óg Maguire, 24: Fermanagh and Lisnaskea Gaelic footballer, industrial accident.
- 15 September – Nevin Spence, 22: rugby union player, farm accident.
- 20 September – Paul O'Connor, 49: former Cork hurler and midfielder on the Fitzgibbon Cup Team of the Century, unexpectedly.
- 21 September – Bill King, 102: sailor.
- 28 September – Larry Cunningham, 74: showband singer, short illness.
- 30 September – P. J. Morley, 81: former Fianna Fáil politician.

=== October ===
- 11 October – Seamus Bonner: former Donegal Gaelic footballer, short illness.
- 28 October – Savita Halappanavar, 31: pregnant dentist whose controversial death at University Hospital Galway led to an international outcry.
- 30 October – Trevor West, 74: academic and politician.

=== November ===
- 13 November – John Kelly, 83: Olympic walker.
- 14 November
  - Bobby Burns: former Longford Gaelic footballer.
  - Martin Fay, 76: fiddler and founder-member of The Chieftains.
  - Paddy Meegan, 90: former Meath Gaelic footballer.
- 30 November – Conor O'Malley, 82: eye surgeon and inventor.

=== December ===
- 4 December – Tony Sweeney, 81: racing journalist and historian of Irish racing, following an illness.
- 10 December – Ciarán Maher, 50: former Dublin Gaelic footballer, suddenly.
- 15 December – Páidí Ó Sé, 57: former Kerry Gaelic footballer and manager, suspected heart attack.
- 16 December – Donal Nevin, 88: former chairman of the Irish Congress of Trade Unions, long illness.
- 19 December – Pecker Dunne, 79: musician, long illness.
- 20 December – Niall FitzGerald, 81: former Cork Gaelic footballer, illness.
- 21 December – Shane McEntee, 56: Fine Gael politician and Minister of State, suicide.
- 22 December – Arthur Quinlan, 92: journalist.
- 24 December – Dennis O'Driscoll, 58: poet, illness.
- 28 December – Frankie Walsh, 76: former Waterford hurler, short illness.
- 31 December
  - Mary Kate Byrne, 108: Ireland's oldest woman.
  - Jimmy Dennigan, 74: former Cork Gaelic footballer and referee.
