= 2011 in Ireland =

- Centuries: 19th; 20th; 21st
- Decades: 1990s; 2000s; 2010s; 2020s
- See also: 2011 in Northern Ireland; Other events of 2011; List of years in Ireland

Events during the year 2011 in Ireland.

== Incumbents ==
- President:
  - Mary McAleese (until 10 November 2011)
  - Michael D. Higgins (from 11 November 2011)
- Taoiseach:
  - Brian Cowen (FF) (until 9 March 2011)
  - Enda Kenny (FG) (from 9 March 2011)
- Tánaiste:
  - Mary Coughlan (FF) (until 9 March 2011)
  - Eamon Gilmore (Lab) (from 9 March 2011)
- Minister for Finance:
  - Brian Lenihan (FF) (until 9 March 2011)
  - Michael Noonan (FG) (from 9 March 2011)
- Chief Justice:
  - John L. Murray (until 25 July 2011)
  - Susan Denham (from 25 July 2011)
- Dáil:
  - 30th (until 1 February 2011)
  - 31st (from 9 March 2011)
- Seanad:
  - 23rd (until 20 April 2011)
  - 24th (from 25 May 2011)

== Events ==
=== January ===
- 1 January
  - The Civil Partnership Act came into effect allowing civil partnerships where hetero- and homosexual cohabiting couples have the same rights.
  - Met Éireann confirmed that December 2010 was the coldest on record, with a temperature of -17.5 °C recorded in Straide, County Mayo, on Christmas Day.
- 5 January
  - Michael Finneran, Minister of State at the Department of the Environment, Heritage and Local Government of the Fianna Fáil party, announced he would not contest the 2011 general election.
  - Minister for Defence, Fianna Fáil's Tony Killeen announced he will not contest the 2011 general election.
- 8 January – Fianna Fáil Teachta Dála (TD) for Meath East, Mary Wallace, announced she will not contest the 2011 general election.
- 18 January – A spectacular fireball that exploded in the clear Irish sky at 6 pm was witnessed across the country. Astronomers calculated that it may have landed as a meteorite in County Clare.
- 22 January – The Taoiseach, Brian Cowen, resigned his position as leader of the Fianna Fáil party.
- 23 January – The Green Party withdrew from the coalition government, making an immediate general election necessary. John Gormley (Minister for the Environment, Heritage and Local Government) and Eamon Ryan (Minister for Communications, Energy and Natural Resources) resigned, leaving only seven ministers remaining in the cabinet, the constitutional minimum.
- 25 January
  - Fianna Fáil's Micheál Martin was elected party leader.
  - Fianna Fáil TD for Galway East, Noel Treacy, announced he will not contest the 2011 general election, while Fianna Fáil's Mattie McGrath, TD for Tipperary South, announced he is leaving the party to become an independent.
- 26 January – British Prime Minister David Cameron announced that Sinn Féin's Gerry Adams has resigned from the British parliament by nominal appointment as Crown Steward and Bailiff of the Manor of Northstead.
- 28 January – Another fireball exploded in the Irish atmosphere. Astronomy Ireland appealed to the public to report sightings.

=== February ===
- 1 February
  - Fianna Fáil TD for Limerick West, John Cregan, announced he will not contest the 2011 general election.
  - It was announced that the Sunday Tribune newspaper had gone into receivership following the decision of Independent News & Media to stop funding it.
  - The Taoiseach dissolved the Dáil and went to Áras an Uachtaráin where President McAleese signed a proclamation of dissolution. The Minister for Local Government made an order appointing 25 February as polling day. The Clerk of the Dáil issued a writ to the constituency returning officers to initiate a general election, officially allowing posters of the candidates to be displayed.
  - A Russian agent was expelled from Ireland because of his role in the forgery of Irish passports for use in the "Illegals Program" spy ring in the United States. A Garda investigation discovered that members of the Russian espionage agency, the SVR, were involved in the forgeries. Alexander Smirnov, the first secretary in the Russian embassy's consular section, was instructed to leave Ireland.
- 2 February – Russian deputy foreign minister Vladimir Titov threatened Ireland that Russia will retaliate for the Irish expulsion of a Russian forger. Ireland warned Russia that retaliation would be unjustified. An Irish government spokesman said Irish embassy staff in Moscow perform no spying activity.
- 5 February – It emerged that a large number of gun enthusiasts had mounted legal challenges against the Criminal Justice (Miscellaneous Provisions) Act of August 2009 which banned handguns and restricted access to other firearms.
- 7 February – The first gay civil partnership under the newly enacted civil partnership law took place in the Civil Registration Office in Dublin.
- 10 February – A small plane carrying ten passengers and two crew crashed while landing in fog at Cork Airport. Six people were killed.
- 25 February – A general election was held. There were party reverses and gains on a historic scale with support for the outgoing government parties Fianna Fáil and the Green Party collapsing. Dominic Hannigan and John Lyons were the first openly LGBT members of Dáil Éireann at the time of election.

=== March ===
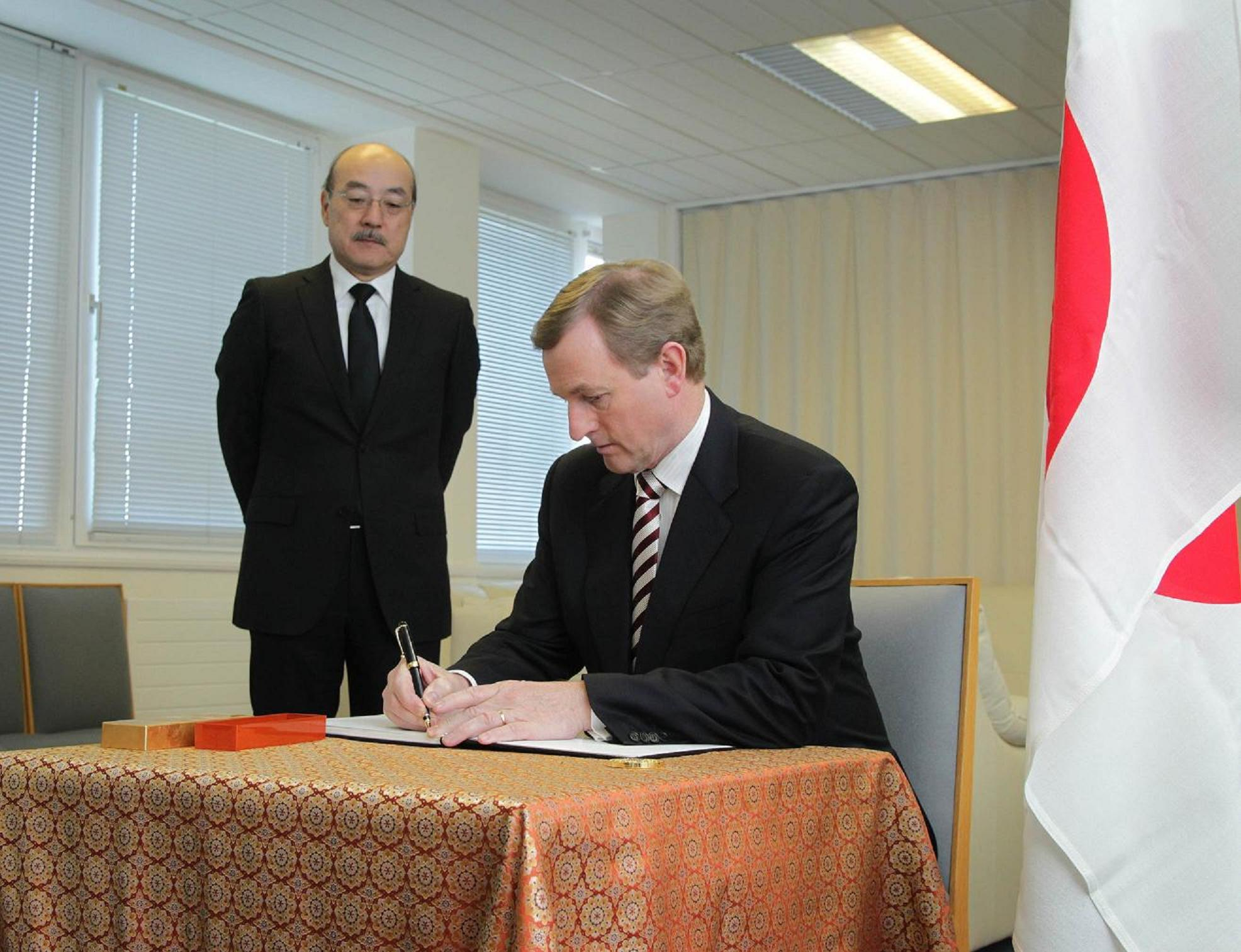
Taoiseach Enda Kenny (right), visited to the Embassy of Japan in Dublin, to sign a book of condolence for the victims of the 2011 Tōhoku earthquake and tsunami, and he met with Japanese Ambassador to Ireland Toshinao Urabe (left), on 22 March 2011.

- 9 March – The members of the 31st Dáil convened for the first time and elected Enda Kenny as Taoiseach by a vote of 117–27.

=== April ===
- 12–14 April – The Dalai Lama Tenzin Gyatso visited Ireland for the third time. He delivered a speech on the 13th to 2,000 people at a conference in Saggart and visited the town of Kildare. The following day, he gave an address to 3,100 people at the University of Limerick entitled "The Power of Forgiveness". He last visited Ireland in March 1991, and has also visited Northern Ireland three times.

=== May ===
- Mission to Prey, a television programme presented by Aoife Kavanagh, was aired on RTÉ One, which defamed Fr. Kevin Reynolds. Justice and Defence Minister Alan Shatter supported the programme at the time.
- 17 May–20 May – Elizabeth II paid the first state visit by a monarch of the United Kingdom to Ireland since its Independence.
- 23 May – President Barack Obama of the United States paid an official visit to Ireland which included Dublin and his ancestral village of Moneygall. He curtailed his visit because of a looming volcanic ash cloud from the Grímsvötn volcano, and departed for London instead of staying the night in Dublin.

=== June ===
- 30 June–3 July – the Tall Ships' Races began in Waterford. Half a million people were expected to attend the festival.

=== July ===
- 1 July – The value added tax rate was lowered from 13.5% to 9% for a range of services connected to the hospitality and tourism sectors.
- 7 July – Politician Avril Doyle withdrew from the race to be the Fine Gael party's presidential candidate.
- 13 July – The Cloyne Report was published, an investigation into how the Cloyne Diocese mishandled child sexual abuse allegations. The investigating commission stated that the greatest failure by the diocese was the failure to report all abuse cases to the Gardaí.
- 20 July – The taoiseach, Enda Kenny, delivered a speech in Dáil Éireann, in response to the Cloyne Report, strongly attacking the Vatican and the Catholic Church.
- 28 July – The Irish writer Jonathan Swift was honoured by the International Astronomical Union when it named two geological features on the Martian moon Phobos after geographical entities from Swift's novel, Gulliver's Travels. The Lagado Planitia (Lagado plain) on Phobos was named after the fictional city Lagado, while Laputa Regio (Laputa region) was named after the fictional flying island, Laputa.

=== August ===
- 2 August – David Norris withdrew from his presidential election campaign, following controversy (although he resumed his candidacy the following month).
- 6 August – It was reported that surveys had suggested that a shipwreck found off Rutland Island, County Donegal was from the Spanish Armada.

=== September ===
- 7 September – Telecommunication company TalkTalk announced the loss of 575 jobs with the closure of its call centre in Waterford.
- 13 September – Homeowner Teresa Treacy was jailed for contempt of court in County Offaly. Government contractors cut down 12,000 of her trees to make way for electricity pylons while she was detained.
- 22 September – The first Irish case of death by spontaneous combustion was recorded in Galway.

=== October ===
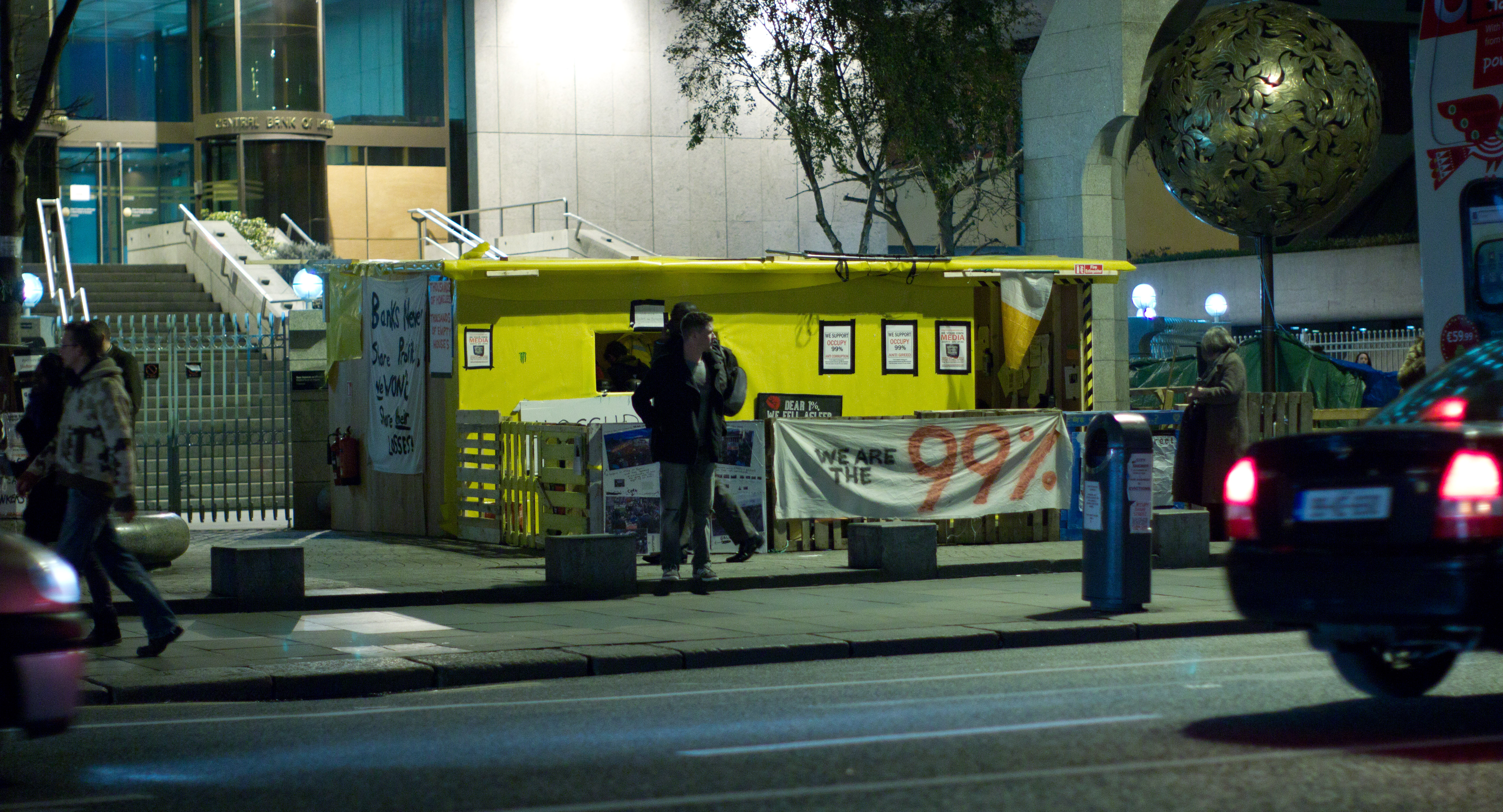
Occupy Dame Street camp in November 2011

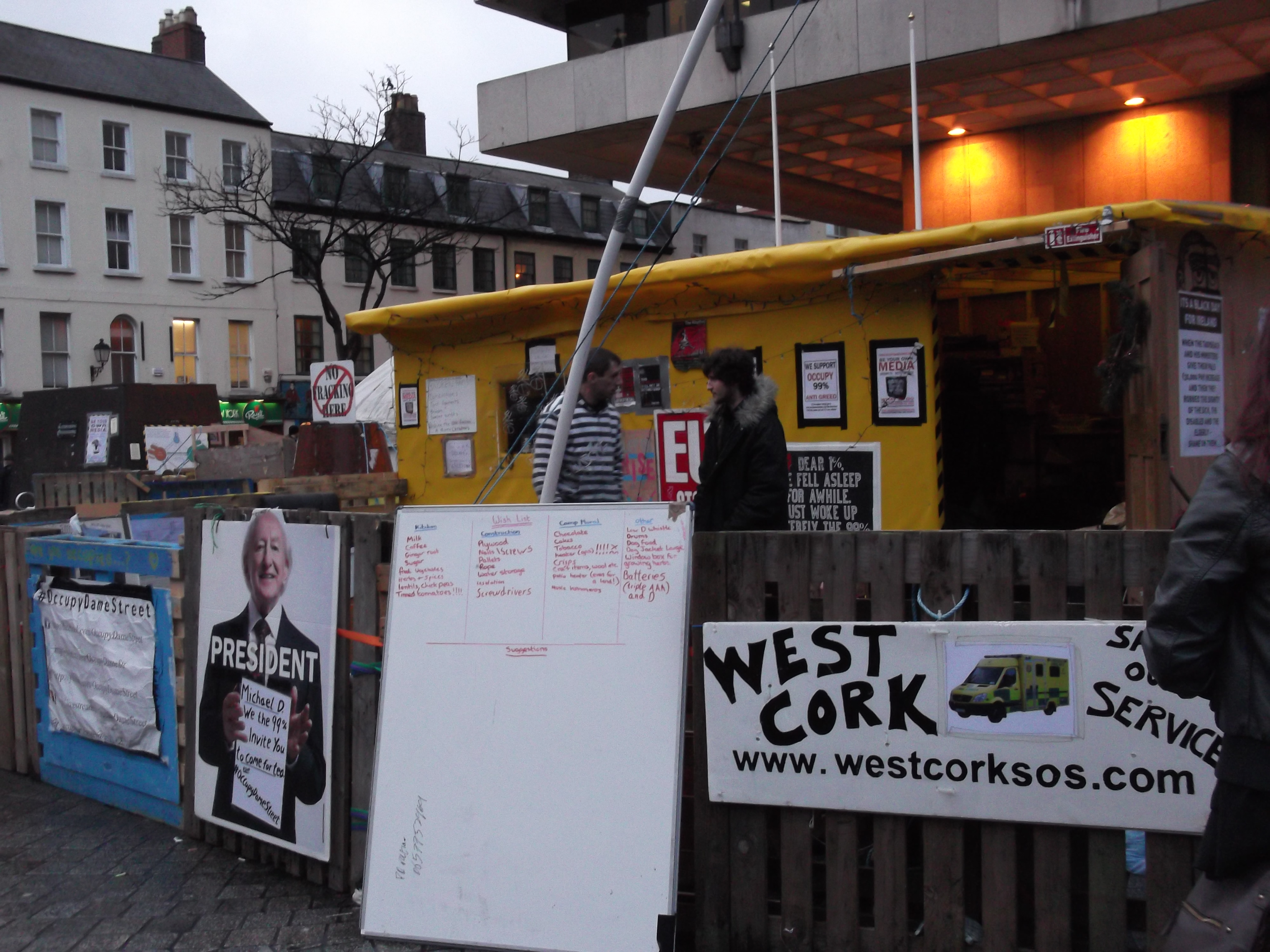
The entrance to the Occupy Dame Street "Tent Town" on 19 December 2011

- 8 October – Occupy Dame Street began this afternoon.
- 11 October
  - Ireland's association football team reached the play-offs of the UEFA Euro 2012 qualifiers.
  - 11 October – Two crosses were stolen in a masked raid on Holy Cross Abbey.
- 24 October – Ireland was struck by flash floods including heavy torrential rain in Dublin with up to 90mm of rain falling during six hours in the evening. One off-duty Garda, Ciarán Jones, was swept off a bridge and killed while helping motorists in Wicklow.
- 27 October – A presidential election and two constitutional referendums were held.

=== November ===
- 3 November – The Department of Foreign Affairs and Trade announced the closure of Ireland's embassies in Iran and the Vatican, and its representative office in East Timor, as a cost-cutting measure during the serious Irish financial crisis.
- 11 November – Michael D. Higgins was inaugurated as President of Ireland at a ceremony in Dublin Castle.
- 15 November
  - The Irish association football team qualified for UEFA Euro 2012 in Poland/Ukraine.
  - Willie Penrose resigned as Minister of State for Housing and Planning due to his opposition to the Government's decision to close the army barracks in Mullingar.
- 16 November – Thousands of students and their families from around Ireland marched on Government Buildings in Dublin to protest against the re-introduction of third-level education fees. A small group also engage in a sit-down protest outside the Fine Gael office on Upper Mount Street.
- 22 November – Fine Gael's Darren Scully resigned as Mayor of Naas after commenting on live radio about the alleged "aggressive attitude" of "black Africans".
- 23 November – The Prime Time Investigates television programme was cancelled as Director-General of RTÉ Noel Curran described the broadcasting of "Mission to Prey" as "one of the gravest editorial mistakes ever made" at RTÉ.
- 26 November – Thousands of people marched against austerity in Dublin.
- 29 November – Three student union presidents (of Galway-Mayo Institute of Technology, University College Cork and IT Carlow) under the leadership of Union of Students in Ireland (USI) President Gary Redmond, and in possession of a chemical toilet and supplies of food that could have lasted them weeks, occupied a room at the Department of Social Protection on Store Street in Dublin as part of a continued effort to have the Labour Party clarify its position on tuition fees. Ten student union presidents also attempted to occupy a room at the Department of Enterprise on Kildare Street.
- 30 November
  - Nine Free Education for Everyone (FEE) students seeking clarification of the government's view on third-level education fees participated in a sit-down protest by occupying the constituency office of Fine Gael TD and former mayor Brian Walsh in Bohermore, Galway. They unfurled a banner on the roof with the message, "Free Education Nothing Less".
  - Audits of child protection practices conducted by the National Board for Safeguarding Children in the Catholic Church were published by six dioceses, with the Roman Catholic Diocese of Raphoe, overseen by Philip Boyce, coming in for most criticism.
  - A settlement was reached between the Roman Catholic Archdiocese of Armagh and a man sworn to secrecy by Seán Brady over abuse by Brendan Smyth as a teenager.

=== December ===
- 1 December
  - Tommy Broughan TD was expelled from the Labour Party after voting to reject a government amendment to extend the bank guarantee for another year.
  - Roscrea District Court solicitors walked out over the closure of the courthouse.
- 2 December – Eight students from the National University of Ireland, Maynooth (NUIM), including the university's student union president Rob Munnelly, occupied the Naas constituency office of Fine Gael TD Anthony Lawlor. They brought sleeping bags, clothes, a chemical toilet and a week's supply of food. During the occupation Munnelly debated with Lawlor live on Kildare TV, USI President Gary Redmond visited the students, and a banner with the slogan "Save the Grant" was erected at Lawlor's entrance.
- 3 December – Hundreds of people from County Donegal assembled in Buncrana to protest against austerity and to tell the government that "Inishowen and Donegal says no to further cuts and austerity".
- 6 December – Patrick Nulty TD voted against the value added tax increase in the 2012 budget and lost the Labour Party whip as a result.
- 16 December – Staff at the Vita Cortex plant in Cork began a sit-in after being told their jobs were eliminated and that they were to receive no redundancy payments.
- 19 December – The Criminal Law (Defence and the Dwelling) Act 2012 was signed by President Higgins. The new home defence law, which came into effect on 13 January 2012, allowed householders to defend their homes against intruders using reasonable force, including lethal force.

=== Full date unknown ===
- A statue of Queen Victoria which was first erected in 1849 at Queen's College, Cork on the occasion of the monarch's first state visit to Ireland, and which was subsequently removed and buried for decades for safekeeping, was brought to the Tyndall Institute on the Mardyke for Queen Elizabeth II's visit

== The arts ==
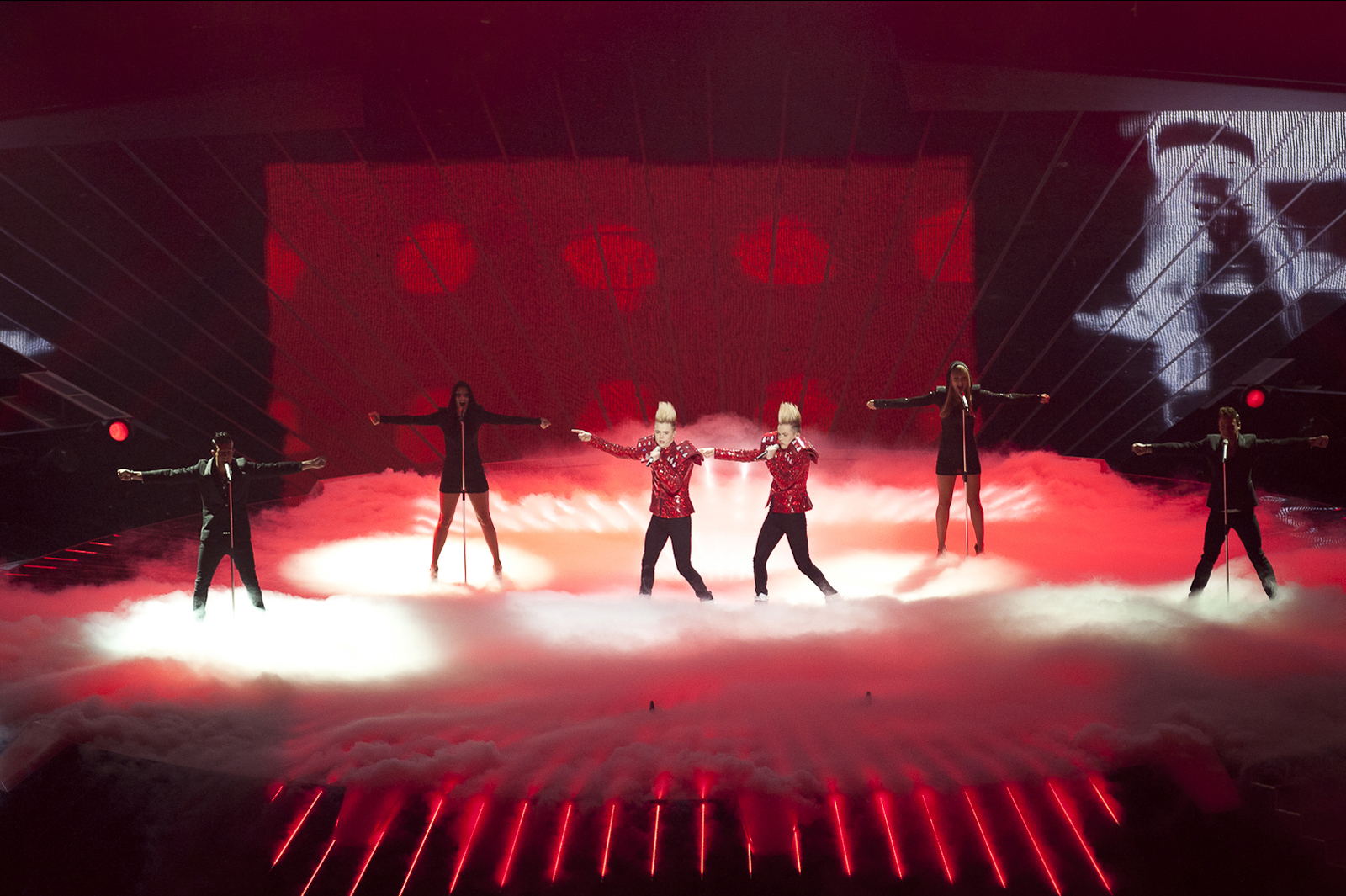
Jedward represent Ireland in the Eurovision Song Contest in Düsseldorf in May.

- 20 January – First showing of the film The Guard.
- 1 February – It was announced that two of three Waterstone's bookshops in Dublin were to close.
- 11 February – The Eurosong 2011 competition was held in Dublin.
- 12 February – The 8th Irish Film and Television Awards were held at Dublin's Convention Centre.
- 5 April – Kevin Barry's speculative fiction debut novel City of Bohane was published.
- 12 April – Sebastian Barry was inducted into the Hennessy Literary Awards Hall of Fame by the President, Mary McAleese.
- 26 May – John Banville won the Kafka Prize for literature.
- 22–26 June – The Celtic Fringe Festival was held in north County Sligo.
- 25 October – Lucy Caldwell was awarded the Rooney Prize for Irish Literature.
- 3 November – Actor Niall Tóibín was honoured with the Irish Film and Television Academy's (IFTA) Lifetime Achievement Award at a ceremony at the Irish Film Institute.
- Sorj Chalandon's novel Retour à Killybegs was published.
- Gene Kerrigan's crime novel The Rage was published.
- Seán Ó Ríordáin's collected poems, Na Dánta, were published.

== Sport ==
=== Association football ===
==== 2011 Nations Cup ====
- 8–9 February and 24–29 May – 2011 Nations Cup association football tournament in Dublin.
- 8 February – Ireland 3–0 Wales.
- 9 February – Northern Ireland 0–3 Scotland.
- 24 May – Ireland 5–0 Northern Ireland.
- 25 May – Wales 1–3 Scotland.
- 27 May – Wales 2–0 Northern Ireland.
- 29 May – Ireland 1–0 Scotland.

==== 2012 UEFA European Championships Qualifiers ====
- 26 March – European Championship qualifying match: Ireland 2–1 Macedonia in Dublin.
- 2 September – Ireland 0–0 Slovakia in Dublin.
- 6 September – Ireland 0–0 Russia in Moscow.
- 7 October – Ireland 2–0 Andorra in Barcelona.
- 11 October – Ireland 2–1 Armenia in Dublin.
- 11 November – Ireland 4–0 Estonia in Tallinn.
- 15 November – Ireland 1–1 Estonia in Dublin.

==== International friendly matches ====
- 29 March – Ireland 2–3 Uruguay in Dublin.
- 7 June – Ireland 2–0 Italy at Stade Maurice Dufrasne, in Liège.
- 10 August – Ireland 0–0 Croatia at the Aviva Stadium, in Dublin.

==== League of Ireland ====
- 4 March – Beginning of League of Ireland season.
- 14 May – Shamrock Rovers won the 2011 Setanta Sports Cup.
- 25 August – Shamrock Rovers became the first Irish side to reach the group stages of either of the top two European competitions by beating Partizan Belgrade in the play-off round of the 2011–12 UEFA Europa League.
- 24 September – Derry City won the 2011 League of Ireland Cup.
- 25 October – Shamrock Rovers reclaimed the League.
- 6 November – Sligo Rovers won the 2011 FAI Cup.

=== Athletics ===
- 11 December – Fionnuala Britton won Senior Women's gold in the 2011 European Cross Country Championships

=== Cricket ===
- 2 March – Ireland beat England by three wickets in Bangalore at the World Cup with a Kevin O'Brien hitting the fastest World Cup century off only 50 balls.

=== Gaelic games ===
==== Football ====
- May–18 September – All-Ireland Senior Football Championship 2011

==== Hurling ====
- 21 May–4 September – All-Ireland Senior Hurling Championship 2011

=== Rugby ===
==== Heineken Cup ====
- 21 May 2011 – 2011 Heineken Cup Final Leinster 33–22 Northampton Saints

==== 2011 Six Nations Championship ====
- 5 February – Six Nations Italy 11–13 Ireland.
- 13 February – Ireland 22–25 France.
- 27 February – Scotland 18–21 Ireland
- 12 March – Wales 19–13 Ireland
- 19 March – Ireland 24–8 England.

==== Rugby World Cup ====
- 11 September – Ireland 22–10 United States
- 17 September – Ireland 15–6 Australia
- 25 September – Ireland 62–12 Russia
- 2 October – Ireland 36–6 Italy
- 8 October – Ireland 10–22 Wales

== Deaths ==
=== January ===
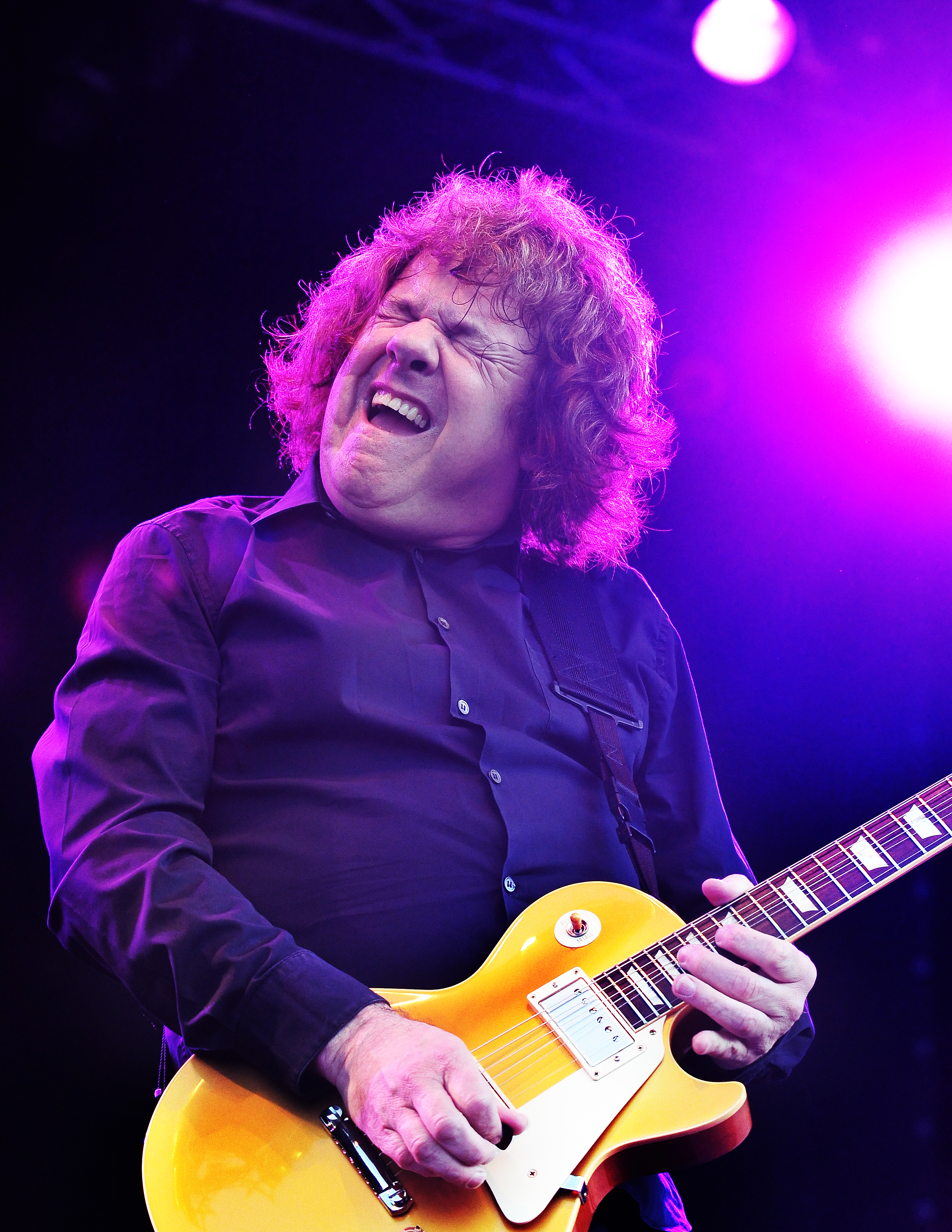
Gary Moore

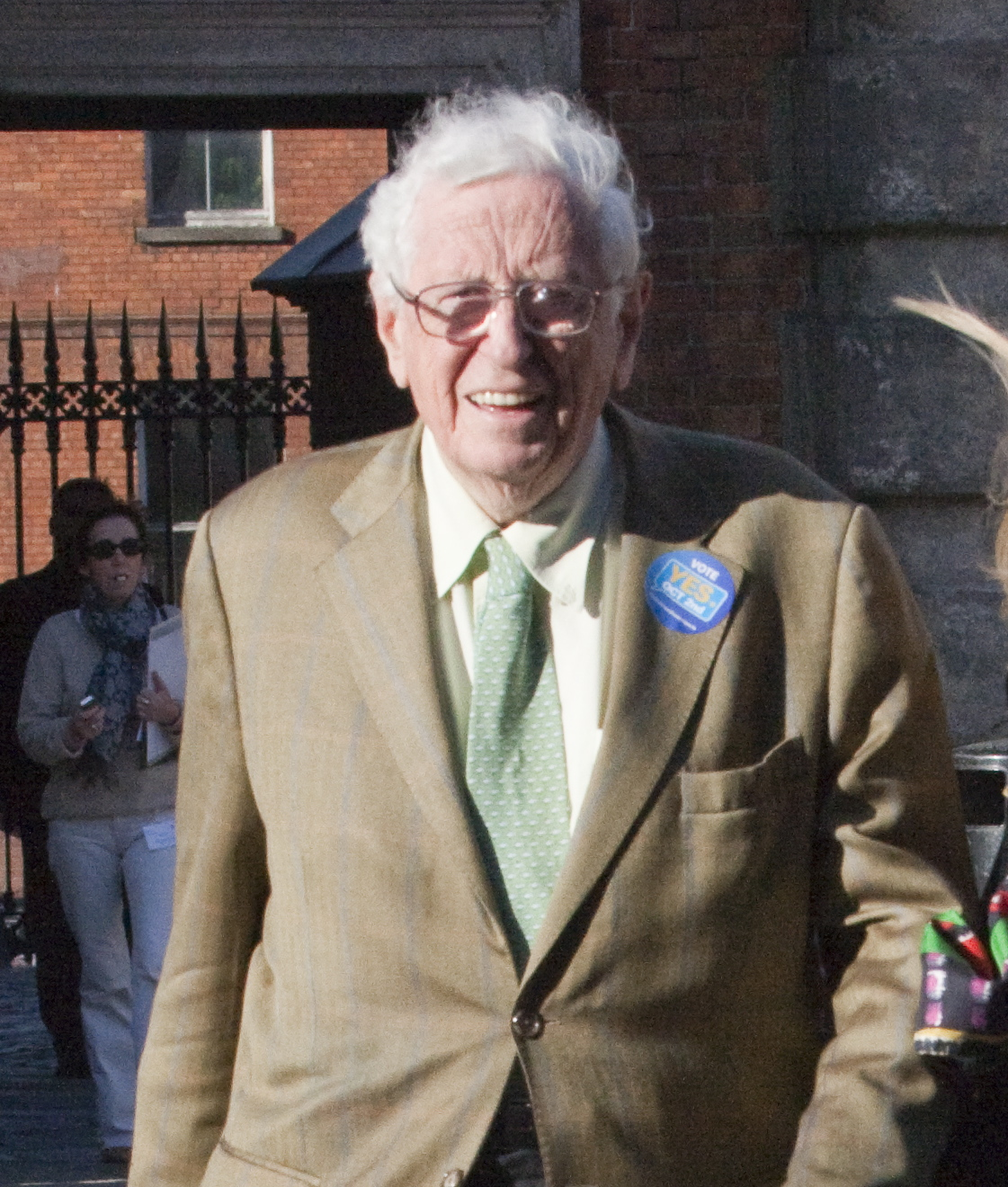
Garret FitzGerald

- 2 January – Eoin Neeson, 83: historian, author, journalist, former director of the Government Information Bureau.
- 9 January – Joss Lynam: mountaineer, founder member of Irish Mountaineering Club, following a short illness.
- 10 January – Michaela McAreavey née Harte, 27: daughter of Tyrone Gaelic football manager Mickey Harte, strangled during her honeymoon in Mauritius.
- 16 January – Louis McRedmond, 78: journalist and author, former editor of the Irish Independent, head of information at RTÉ.
- 18 January – David Schulman, 80: former President of Mensa International, and charity volunteer.
- 20 January – Gordon Holmes, former State Solicitor of Limerick, former chairman of the Parole Board and the former Garda Síochána Complaints Board.

=== February ===
- 6 February – Gary Moore, 58: former Thin Lizzy guitarist. Heart attack while on holiday in Estepona, Spain.
- 13 February – T. P. McKenna, 81; actor. Died in his sleep after a long illness.
- 14 February – Sean Boru, 57, Actor and author.

=== March ===
- 9 March – Seán Cronin, 91, journalist and republican, Irish Republican Army chief of staff (1957–1958, 1959–1960), after long illness.
- 14 March – Gerald Barry, 63; broadcast and print journalist, following a long illness.
- 25 March – Thady Wyndham-Quin, 7th Earl of Dunraven and Mount-Earl, 71, aristocrat.

=== April ===
- 15 April – Michael Hurley, 87, Jesuit and ecumenical theologian, co-founder of the Irish School of Ecumenics.
- 27 April – Harry Thuillier, 85, Olympic fencer and radio presenter.

=== May ===
- 4 May – Joe Murray, 74; broadcaster and journalist, following a short illness.
- 10 May – Patrick Galvin, 83; writer and poet, following a long illness.
- 17 May
  - Tomás Mac Anna, 87; playwright, actor and director, following a short illness.
  - Seán Dunphy, 73; showband singer, following a short illness.
- 19 May – Garret FitzGerald, 85; former taoiseach, following a short illness.
- 20 May – Michael Bell, 74; former TD
- 21 May – John Delaney, 42, businessman (Intrade).
- 21 May – Pádraig Kennelly, 82, publisher, editor and journalist, founder of Kerry's Eye.
- 24 May – Edward Plunkett, 20th Baron of Dunsany, 71, artist.

=== June ===
- 3 June – Peter Murphy, 88, television presenter (RTÉ).
- 6 June – Declan Costello, 84; former teachta dála (TD) and judge
- 7 June – Liam Kelly, 88, Republican and politician.
- 10 June – Brian Lenihan Jnr, 52; serving TD
- 22 June – Kader Asmal, 76, human rights professor, founder of the British and Irish Anti-Apartheid Movements, founder member of the Irish Council for Civil Liberties, Birmingham Six campaigner, minister of Nelson Mandela's first democratically elected government of South Africa.
- 22 June – Myles Staunton, 75; former TD.

=== July ===
- 19 July – Brendan Kehoe, 40, software developer and author, after a battle with acute myeloid leukemia.

=== August ===
- 4 August – Éamonn O'Doherty, 72; sculptor.

=== September ===
- 7 September – Adrian Cronin, 74, RTÉ Television head of light entertainment, The Late Late Show director, Eurovision Song Contest director, producer, programme presenter, documentary maker, scriptwriter.
- 26 September – David Timlin, 73, RTÉ radio and television newsreader, news reporter, presenter, announcer; Irish Press subeditor.

=== October ===
- 11 October – Peter McDermott, 93; former Meath Gaelic footballer and coach.
- 12 October – Martin White, 102; former Kilkenny hurler and the oldest surviving All-Ireland medal winner.
- 22 October – Cathal O'Shannon, 83; journalist and television presenter.

=== November ===
- 9 November – Terry Willers, 76; cartoonist.

=== December ===
- 7 December – Pearse Cahill, 95; pioneering aviator.
- 25 December
  - Thomas Finnegan, 86; bishop.
  - Seán French, 80, politician, Lord Mayor of Cork (1976) and TD (1967–1982).

== See also ==
- 2011 in Irish television
