= Night Warriors =

Night Warriors may refer to:

- Night Warriors – Darkstalkers' Revenge, an arcade game in the Darkstalkers series

- Night Warriors: Darkstalkers' Revenge (anime), an animated adaptation of it.

- Night Warriors (novel), the first novel in Graham Masterton's Night Warriors series
