= 2007 in Ireland =

- Centuries: 19th; 20th; 21st
- Decades: 1980s; 1990s; 2000s; 2010s; 2020s
- See also: 2007 in Northern Ireland; Other events of 2007; List of years in Ireland

Events from the year 2007 in Ireland.

== Incumbents ==
- President: Mary McAleese
- Taoiseach: Bertie Ahern (FF)
- Tánaiste:
  - Michael McDowell (PD) (until 14 June 2007)
  - Brian Cowen (FF) (from 14 June 2007)
- Minister for Finance: Brian Cowen (FF)
- Chief Justice: John L. Murray
- Dáil:
  - 29th (until 26 April 2007)
  - 30th (from 14 June 2007)
- Seanad:
  - 22nd (until 4 July 2007)
  - 23rd (from 24 July 2007)

== Events ==
- 18 January – The National Biodiversity Data Centre was formally opened at Beechfield House, Carriganore West Campus, Waterford Institute of Technology.
- 28 January – The new Dublin Port Tunnel opened to general traffic, having already opened to heavy goods vehicles last December 20th.
- 12 March – Docklands railway station opened in its temporary location, the first new station in Dublin's city centre since Tara Street Station in 1891.
- 30 April – President Mary McAleese dissolved the 29th Dáil at the request of Taoiseach Bertie Ahern. The general election was fixed for 24 May.
- 24 May – A general election was held.
- 14 June – The 30th Dáil met and formed a Fianna Fáil–Green Party–Progressive Democrat coalition government.
- 5 July – Ten people were injured after a 150-year-old limestone staircase collapsed at the National Museum of Ireland – Natural History on Merrion Street in Dublin.
- 17 July – A North/South Ministerial Council meeting included the Democratic Unionist Party for the first time.
- 19 July – The red kite bird species was reintroduced in the Wicklow Mountains.
- 26 October – The final People In Need Telethon was held.

== Arts and literature ==
- 23 March – John Carney's musical film Once had its Irish release, at the Savoy Cinema in Dublin.
- May – Michael Scott's fantasy fiction The Alchemyst: The Secrets of the Immortal Nicholas Flamel was published.
- 9 June – Mark O'Rowe's play Terminus was premièred at the Abbey Theatre, Dublin.
- 23 July – Spin South West radio station began broadcasting from Raheen, County Limerick.
- 5 October – The film Garage was released.
- Kevin Barry's short story collection There are Little Kingdoms was published and won the Rooney Prize for Irish Literature.
- Anne Enright's novel The Gathering was published and won the Man Booker Prize.
- Tana French's debut crime novel In the Woods was published.
- Derek Landy's children's novel Skulduggery Pleasant was published and won the Red House Children's Book Award (2008).

== Sport ==
=== Association football ===
- Internationals

European Championship Qualifiers
7 February – San Marino 1–2 Ireland
24 March – Ireland 1–0 Wales
28 March – Ireland 1–0 Slovakia
8 September – Slovakia 2–2 Ireland
12 September – Czech Republic 1–0 Ireland
13 October – Ireland 0–0 Germany
17 October – Ireland 1–1 Cyprus
17 November – Wales 2–2 Ireland

Ireland finished third in the Group and failed to qualify.

- Setanta Cup
  - Winners: Drogheda United
- League of Ireland
  - Winners: Drogheda United
- FAI Cup
  - Winners: Cork City
- 19 February – reigning League of Ireland champions Shelbourne were demoted to the First Division by the Football Association of Ireland after having their Premier Division Licence revoked by the FAI's First Instance Committee. The club was issued a First Division Licence in place of the revoked licence.

=== Cricket ===
2007 Cricket World Cup: In a successful world cup debut, the Ireland cricket team qualified from the group stage for the Super 8 stage, notably defeating Pakistan cricket team in the process.

=== Gaelic games ===
Football
2007 All-Ireland Senior Football Championship Final

16 September: Kerry 3–13 Cork 1–9

Hurling
2007 All-Ireland Senior Hurling Championship Final

2 September: Kilkenny 2–19 Limerick 1–15

=== Golf ===
- Pádraig Harrington finished in the top 10 at the US Masters in Augusta, Georgia. Darren Clarke missed the cut.
- Pádraig Harrington won the British Open in Carnoustie, Scotland. Rory McIlroy won the silver medal for leading amateur. Darren Clarke missed the cut.
- Irish Open was won by Pádraig Harrington (Ireland).

=== Rugby union ===
- 2007 Six Nations Championship
  - Wales 9–19 Ireland
  - Ireland 17–20 France
  - Ireland 43–13 England
  - Scotland 18–19 Ireland
  - Italy 24–51 Ireland
  - Ireland finished second in the Championship, after France but claimed the Triple Crown for the third time in four years.
- 2007 Rugby World Cup
  - Ireland 32–17 Namibia
  - Ireland 14–10 Georgia
  - Ireland 3–25 France
  - Ireland 15–30 Argentina
- 2006–07 Heineken Cup
  - Munster and Leinster both qualified for the quarter finals but failed to progress

== Deaths ==
=== January to June ===
- 3 January – Michael Yeats, Fianna Fáil Seanad member and Member of the European Parliament (MEP) (born 1921).
- 23 January – Jimmy Murray, Roscommon Gaelic footballer and All-Ireland Senior Football Championship-winning captain (born 1917).
- 28 January – Bertie Troy, Roman Catholic priest and All-Ireland Senior Hurling Championship-winning manager with Cork (born 1930).
- 5 February – John S. Beckett, musician, composer and conductor (born 1927).
- 8 February – Benedict Kiely, writer, broadcaster and journalist (born 1919).
- 17 February – Dermot O'Reilly, musician, producer and songwriter (born 1942).
- 25 February – Jackie Gilroy, former Dublin Gaelic footballer (born 1942).
- 11 March – Dave Creedon, former Cork hurler (born 1919).
- 2 April – Emma Groves, blinded by a rubber bullet in 1971, leading campaigner for banning the use of plastic bullets, co-founder of the United Campaign Against Plastic Bullets (born 1920).
- 24 April – Kate Walsh, Progressive Democrats Senator (born 1947).
- 29 April – Con Murphy, Cork hurler and former President of the Gaelic Athletic Association (born 1922).
- 5 May – Michael ffrench-O'Carroll, Independent Teachta Dála (TD) and Senator (born 1919).
- 22 May – Dermot O'Brien, former Louth Gaelic footballer and entertainer (born 1932).
- 30 May – Kieran Carey, Tipperary hurler (born 1933).
- 1 June – John Moriarty, writer and philosopher (born 1938).

=== July to December ===
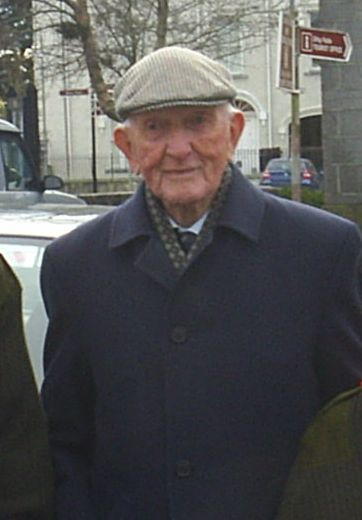
Dan Keating

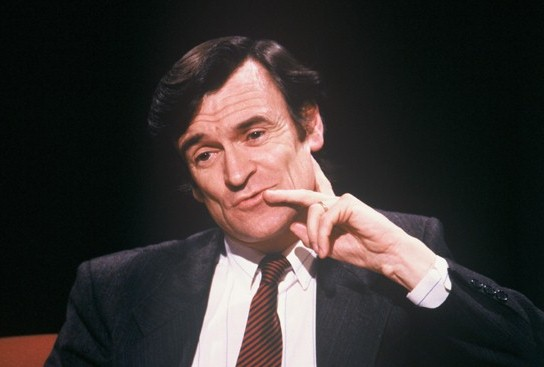
Anthony Clare

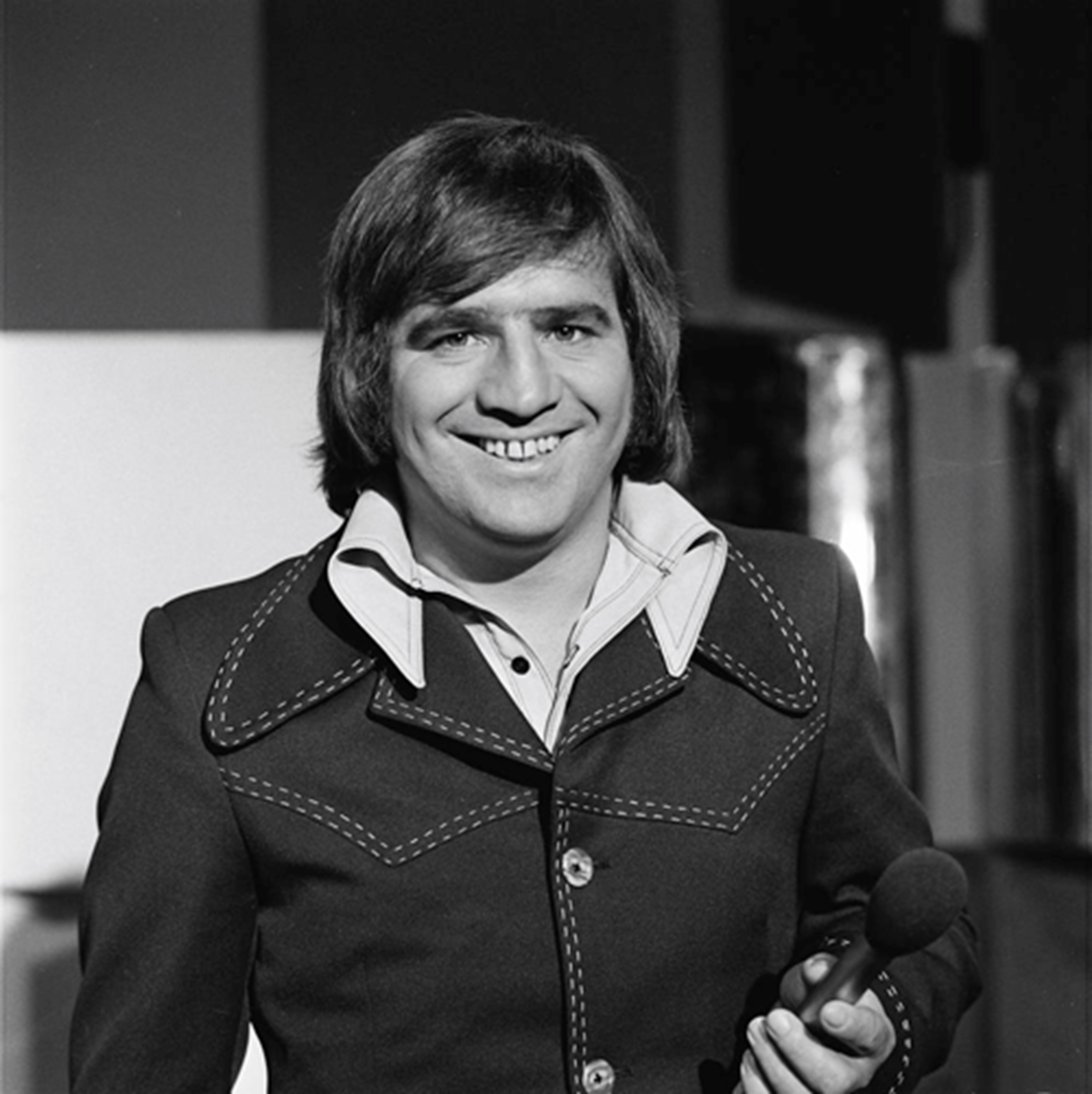
Joe Dolan

- 1 July – John Egan, former Dublin GAA County Chairman (born 1951).
- 9 July – John Wilson, Fianna Fáil TD and Cabinet Minister, former Cavan Gaelic footballer (born 1923).
- 15 July – Kieron Moore, actor (born 1924).
- 23 July – Joan O'Hara, actress (born 1930).
- 1 August – Tommy Makem, folk singer (born 1932).
- 3 August – Éamonn Young, Cork Gaelic footballer (born 1921).
- 10 August – Tom Cheasty, Waterford hurler (born 1934).
- 27 August – Tom Mulligan, Dublin Gaelic footballer (born 1977).
- 30 August – Tom Munnelly, folk-song collector (born 1944).
- 10 September – Joe Sherlock, Labour Party (Ireland) TD (born 1930).
- 26 September – Mick Holden, Gaelic footballer and hurler (born 1954).
- 2 October – Dan Keating, Ireland's oldest man and last surviving veteran of the Irish War of Independence (born 1902).
- 3 October – Tony Ryan, businessman and philanthropist, founder of Guinness Peat Aviation and co-founder of Ryanair (born 1936).
- 6 October – Tom Murphy, actor (born 1968).
- 19 October – Johnny Clifford, Cork hurler (born 1934).
- 22 October – Brendan McWilliams, meteorologist and science writer (born 1944).
- 28 October – Anthony Clare, psychiatrist and broadcaster (born 1942).
- 13 November – Alec Cooke, Baron Cooke of Islandreagh, businessman and politician (born 1920).
- 14 November – Hugh Gibbons, Roscommon Gaelic footballer and Fianna Fáil TD (born 1916).
- 15 November – Ned Power, Waterford hurler (born 1929).
- 3 December – Eileen Proctor, founder and president of the National Association of Widows in Ireland (born 1916).
- 6 December – Katy French, model and socialite (born 1983).
- 7 December – Mick Ryan, Tipperary hurler (born 1925).
- 11 December – Christie Hennessy, folk singer-songwriter (born 1945).
- 14 December – Gene Fitzgerald, Fianna Fáil TD and MEP (born 1932).
- 15 December – Jimmy O'Neill, soccer player (born 1931).
- 26 December – Joe Dolan, singer (born 1939).
- 27 December – Kit Ahern, Fianna Fáil TD (born 1915).

=== Full date unknown ===
- Eamon Law, Kilkenny Irish handball player.

== See also ==
- 2007 in Irish television
