= Hal Roach (disambiguation) =

Hal Roach (1892–1992) was an American film producer.

Hal Roach can also refer to:

- Hal Roach Jr. (1918–1972), film and television producer, and son of the film producer
- Hal Roach (comedian) (1927–2012), Irish comedian
