= Antony Sweeney (disambiguation) =

Antony Sweeney may refer to:

- Anthony Sweeney (born 1938), British judoka
- Antony Sweeney (born 1983), footballer
- Antony G. Sweeney (born 1955), director of the Australian Centre for the Moving Image
- Tony Sweeney (c. 1931–2012), Irish horse racing journalist

== See also ==
- Sweeney (name)
