= Famine (disambiguation) =

A famine is a widespread shortage of food that may apply to any faunal species.

Famine may also refer to:

- Famine (comics), fictional character in the Marvel Comics universe
- Famine (O'Flaherty novel), by Liam O'Flaherty
- Famine (Masterton novel), 1981 novel by Graham Masterton
- Famine (film), 2011 horror film
- Famine (album), 2007 album by Graves of Valor
- Famine, 1977 play by Tom Murphy
- "Famine", a song by Ten in the Swear Jar from Accordion Solo!, 2005
- The Famine, death metal band
- The Famine (film), 1915 film
- The Famines (band), Canadian rock band
- La sale Famine de Valfunde, member of the black metal band Peste Noire
- Famine, one of the Four horsemen of the Apocalypse
