= Davy Group =

Irish stockbroker and investment manager

Davy
- Industry: Financial Services
- Founded: 1926 (Dublin, Ireland)
- Founder: James and Eugene Davy
- Area served: UK and Ireland
- Key people: Bernard Byrne (Interim CEO)
- Number of employees: 700+
- Parent: Bank of Ireland
- Divisions: Wealth Management, Asset Management, Capital Markets, Corporate Finance, Research
- Website: www.davy.ie

Davy Group is an Irish provider of wealth management and investment banking services and has offices in Dublin, Belfast, Cork, Galway and London. Davy offers services to private clients, small businesses, corporations and institutional investors.

As of 2007, Davy was an independent company employing over 700 people. The company's ownership was held its management and staff. In 2021, Davy "put itself up for sale" as a result of fines imposed by the Central Bank of Ireland for violations of market rules. The sale was completed, to Bank of Ireland, in mid-2022.

== Description ==
Davy accounted for approximately 40 per cent of all dealings in Irish equities on the Irish Stock Exchange in 2009. It was the broker to 9 of the top 10 companies listed on the Irish Stock Exchange. Over the preceding years, Davy had been responsible for circa 70 per cent of funds raised on the Irish Stock Exchange.

According to annual accounts published Davy had retained profits at the end of 2011 of €110.545 million compared with €124.99 million in the previous year.

== History ==
=== 20th century ===
James and Eugene Davy were raised in Rathmines.

Davy Headquarters at Dawson St, Dublin, Ireland

=== 21st century ===
In 2006, Davy opened another regional office in Galway.

The same year, Davy opened a dedicated office for Northern Ireland, located in Belfast city centre.

Davy was the only Irish dealer in Irish Government Bonds, when the country returned to the market for the first time since 2010 in January 2012.

In 2012, Davy Research was named Ireland's No.1 brokerage and also the country's No.1 Equity Research Team in the Institutional Investor All-Europe Research Team 2012 Survey.

Davy advised the Irish Government on the sale of the national lottery license, operated by the stated owned An Post.

On 8 March 2012, Davy announced acquired Bloxham Stockbrokers private client business. The following May, Davy announced that it had acquired Bloxham's asset management business. The two acquisitions increased Davy's assets under management by approximately €1.2 billion.

When the Irish Stock Exchange demutualised in April 2014, the broker became its largest shareholder holding 37.5% of the Exchange.

In 2018, Davy along with Bastow Charleton Wealth Management (BCWM) were appointed by the liquidator of Custom House Capital to take over the return and administration of client funds following the collapse of the company following a fraud.

In 2022, Davy was acquired by Bank of Ireland in a €427m deal.

In 2024, Davy sold its property arm to David Goddard, with it rebranding to Lanthorn.

== Controversy ==
=== Bribery and payments to politicians ===
The Mahon Tribunal established that Davy, throughout the 1980s and 1990s, made a series of payments to the corrupt politician Liam Lawlor.

In 1992, Davy made a political donation of a £5,000 cheque to Bertie Ahern, which was paid into Fianna Fáil constituency official Tim Collins's account who stated in writing when opening it that the account was for his own use only.

=== Tax evasion ===
Davy admitted that its representatives in 1999 devised a Liechtenstein based tax evasion scheme uncovered by the public service broadcaster, RTÉ.

=== Insider trading scandal ===
In a 2005 insider dealer case, the chief executive of Fyffes plc whose shares were the subject of the illicit trading said that he was "set up" by Davy. He also told the High Court he believed Davy and the party found responsible by the courts of insider dealing had coordinated to sell the shares they held in his company.

=== 2011 Central Bank of Ireland fine ===
In December 2011, the Central Bank reprimanded and fined the firm for failing to report 61,542 transactions. Davy described the breaches as "technical".

=== Contract for Difference (CFD) pushing scandal ===
A former client of Davy with intellectual disabilities was awarded €2m by the High Court in 2014 after the court found that Davy had caused him substantial investment losses through "deliberate neglect".

=== Siteserv controversy ===
In January 2012 the board of Siteserv announced the appointment of Davy Corporate Finance to advise (alongside KMPG) on their strategic and corporate options given the pending maturity of their debt with IBRC. 18 months after the Siteserv deal Des Carville, the Davy adviser on the transaction joined the Department of Finance. In responses to parliamentary questions posed, the Department of Finance said that Carville had declared a potential conflict of interest arising from his involvement with Siteserv before he joined.

=== 2021 bond trading scandal ===
In March 2021 the Davy Group was fined €4.1m by the Central Bank of Ireland relating to a 2014 bond trading deal in which 16 Davy employees including CEO Brian McKiernan and former Chairman Kyran McLaughlin, were involved in acquiring bonds for a below market value price of €5.58m from a client and not disclosing to the client that it was Davy staff who had bought the bonds. The bonds were later sold on at a profit to a third party fund manager. Following the investigation by the Central Bank of Ireland and the issuing of the fine many of the senior executive team were forced to resign and the business was put up for sale.

== See also ==
- Bloxham Stockbrokers
