= Custom House Capital =

Collapsed Investment Firm in Dublin, Ireland

- Type: Investment firm
- Industry: Financial services
- Founded: 1997
- Defunct: 2011
- Fate: Liquidation
- Headquarters: Dublin, Ireland
- Key people: Harry Cassidy (Co-founder and COO)
- Products: Syndicated property investments
- Services: Pensions, wealth and investment management

Custom House Capital (CHC) was an investment firm based in Dublin, Ireland.

In 2011, Kieran Wallace and Eamonn Richardson of KPMG were appointed liquidators following regulatory intervention, due to suspicions around the misappropriation of client funds.

== History ==
The firm was established in 1997 by Patrick O’Sullivan and Tony Burke with Cassidy joining in 1999 from Guinness Mahon.

By 2009 CHC had built up a base of over 2,000 clients and had approximately €1.2 billion of assets under management but had been under surveillance by the Central Bank of Ireland and Financial Regulator because of operational concerns.

In early 2011, Bastow Charleton Wealth Management (BCWM) were engaged to help manage the business due to operational difficulties identified by the Central Bank of Ireland and later carried on as managers following the appointment of the liquidator.

Various notable individuals had been invested in the companies funds including Donncha O'Callaghan, Ronan O'Gara and Brian O'Driscoll.

In 2018, Davy Group and BCWM were appointed to manage the return of funds to clients as well as taking over the management of some assets for former clients.

In 2022, the state's investor compensation fund confirmed there were approximately 2,164 claims approved by the liquidator while there were at least another 173 claims outstanding.

On May 12th, 2023, four of the company's employees were jailed after being convicted of a €61 million conspiracy to defraud investors. Harry Cassidy was the cofounder and Chief Operating Officer of CHC during the period of 2008 to 2011 when the conspiracy occurred and was sentenced to seven years in jail.

In December 2023, the Investor Compensation Company (ICCL) confirmed that they had concluded the client compensation process with over 2,340 clients claims processed.

== See also ==
- Bloxham Stockbrokers
- Quinlan Private
