= Salarian Gate (album) =

Studio album by Graves of Valor
- Released: May 26, 2009
- Recorded: 2009
- Genres: Death metal, deathcore
- Length: 35:27
- Label: Relapse

Professional ratings
Review scores
Source	Rating
Gothtronic	7/10 stars
Funeral Rain Zine	8/10 stars

Salarian Gate is the second studio album by death metal band Graves of Valor. It was released on May 26, 2009 through Relapse Records

== Overview ==
On Friday, May 29 at Earshot Records in Greenville, South Carolina Graves of Valor played a free concert in honor of their second studio album Salarian Gate. The album marked the band's first full-length release and their Debut on Relapse Records. The Album was available for streaming in its entirety exclusively on iLike.com before it was officially released in the U.S. The Album's lyrical content centers around the fall of Rome. Damon Welch, in an interview with Mass Movement Magazine stated "I’m really into history and had just finished reading Edward Gibbon’s ‘The Decline And Fall of the Roman Empire when I began the writing process for this album so that’s what was on my mind at the time...I still love some good ole Satanism myself, I just don’t know enough about it to write a song. Whatever makes for an interesting album is good enough for me."

== Track listing ==
1. "Salarian Gate" - 3:26
2. "Suffocation of the Last King" - 3:45
3. "Pestilence" - 3:34
4. "Bridles of Incitatus" - 3:25
5. "Six Sember Tyrannis" - 3:
6. "Letter of the Blind" - 1:02
7. "To Breathe Blood" - 3:29
8. "The Clever Ape" - 2:50
9. "Diderot" - 1:21
10. "Locusta" - 5:00
11. "No Gods Left" - 4:35

== Personnel ==
- David Hasselbring - bass
- Jeff Springs - guitar
- Richard Turbeville - guitar
- Dayton Cantley - drums
- Damon Welch - vocals
