= Graves of Valor =

American death metal band

- Origin: Florence, South Carolina, United States
- Genres: Death metal Metalcore
- Years active: 2005–2011, 2014–present
- Labels: Tragic Hero Records (2007–2009); Relapse (2009–present)
- Members: Richard Turbeville; Justin Brown; Damon Welch; Jeff Pence; Ryan Blum
- Website: http://www.myspace.com/FROMGRAVESOFVALOR

Graves of Valor is an American death metal band from Florence, South Carolina, United States, formed in 2005. They signed to Relapse Records and released their only album, Salarian Gate, on May 26, 2009.

== History ==
Formed in December 2005 in Florence, South Carolina, as "From Graves of Valor," the band solidified its lineup when ex-Through the Eyes of the Dead members Jeff Springs, Richard Turbeville, and Dayton Cantley joined bassist David Hasselbring and Damon Welch.

The band recorded their debut album, Salarian Gate, at Mana Recording Studios in Tampa, Florida, with engineer Brian Elliott. In April and May 2009, they joined the Relapse Contamination Tour with labelmates Obscura and Abysmal Dawn prior to the album's US release. Graves of Valor completed a three-week tour supporting Salt the Wound in September 2009 with Knights of the Abyss and Within the Ruins.

Graves of Valor disbanded after failing to secure a full line-up and a full-time drummer. The band recently reformed as Ditch Eel with Jeff Springs and Dayton Cantley, shifting from death metal to Southern-inspired metal.

== Members ==
Current

- Richard Turbeville – Guitar
- Damon Welch – Vox
- Justin Brown – Guitar
- Jeff Pence – Drums
- Ryan Blum – Bass

Former

- David Hasselbring – Bass
- Billy Wood – Bass
- Jeff Springs – Guitar
- Dayton Cantley – Drums

== Discography ==
=== as From Graves of Valor ===
- Famine EP (Tragic Hero, 2007)

=== as Graves of Valor ===
- Salarian Gate (Relapse, 2009)
