= Graham Masterton =

British horror author (born 1946)

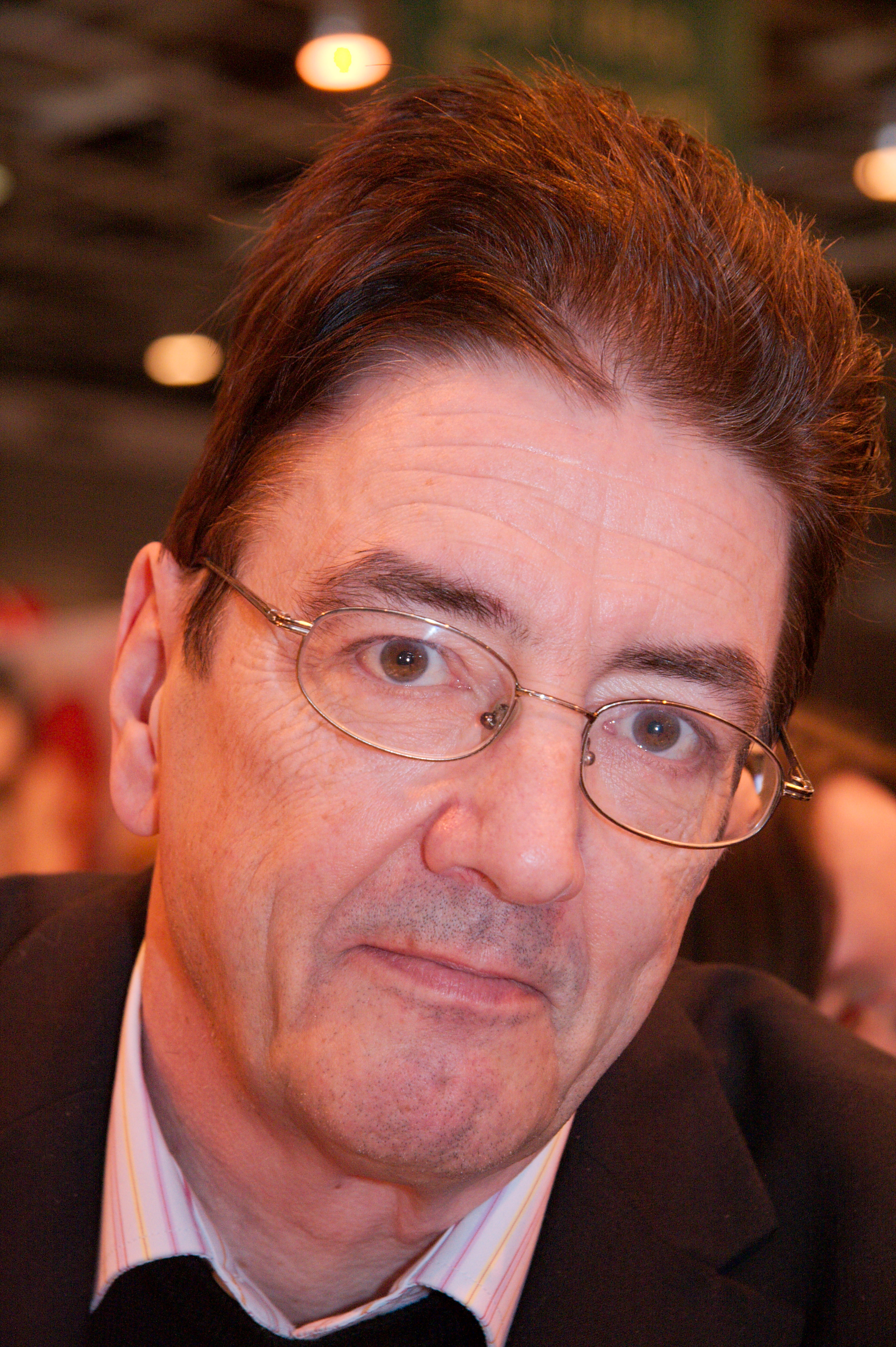
- Masterton at Salon du livre 2008 (Paris, France)
- Born: 16 January 1946 (age 80); Edinburgh, Scotland
- Occupation: Author
- Spouse: Wiescka (died 2011)
- Writing career
- Genre: Horror fiction
- Website: www.grahammasterton.co.uk

Graham Masterton (born 16 January 1946, in Edinburgh) is a British author known primarily for horror fiction. Originally editor of Mayfair and the British edition of Penthouse, his debut novel, The Manitou, was published in 1976. This novel was adapted in 1978 for the film The Manitou. His 1978 novel Charnel House and 1983 novel Tengu garnered positive critical reception, the former receiving a Special Edgar Award by the Mystery Writers of America and the latter being awarded with a silver medal by the West Coast Review of Books. Masterton was also the editor of Scare Care, a horror anthology published for the benefit of abused children in Europe and the United States.

Masterton's novels often contain visceral sex and horror. In addition to his novels, Masterton has written a number of sex instruction books, including How to Drive Your Man Wild in Bed and Wild Sex for New Lovers.

In 2002, Masterton wrote the crime novel A Terrible Beauty, featuring the character Katie Maguire, an Irish detective. The novel was republished in 2013 under the title White Bones, and spawned a number of other novels by Masterton featuring the Maguire character. In 2010, Masterton published Rules of Duel, a short novel that he co-wrote with William S. Burroughs in the early 1970s.

== Career ==
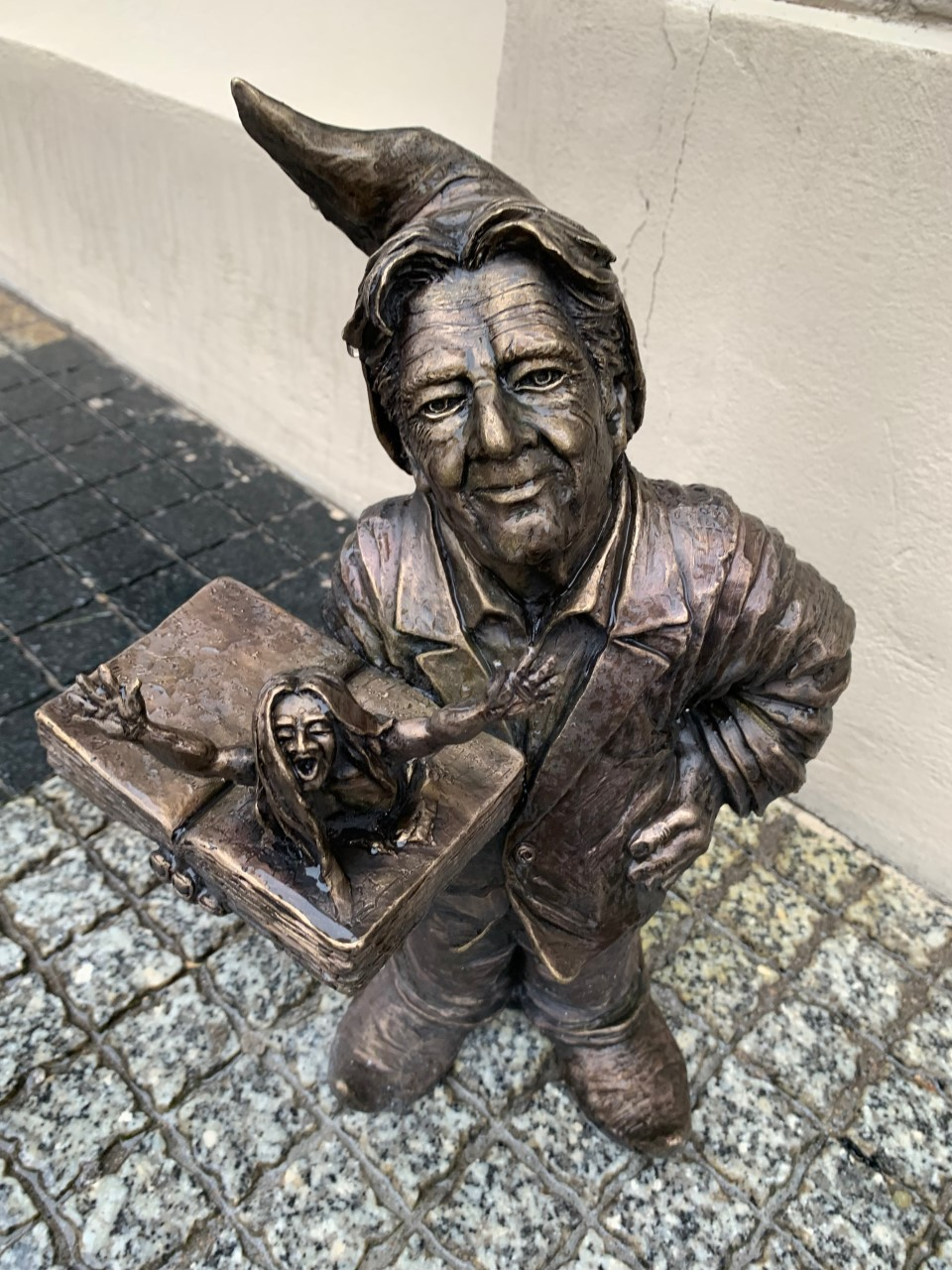
A bronze statue depicting Masterton as a dwarf with a copy of his novel The Manitou, in Wrocław, Poland

Masterton is a former editor of Mayfair and the British edition of Penthouse. His first novel, The Manitou, was published in 1976, and adapted in 1978 for the film The Manitou. Further works garnered critical acclaim, including a Special Edgar Award by the Mystery Writers of America for Charnel House and a silver medal by the West Coast Review of Books for Tengu. He is also the only non-French winner of the prestigious Prix Julia Verlanger for his novel Family Portrait, a reworking of the Oscar Wilde novel The Picture of Dorian Gray. Masterton was also the editor of Scare Care, a horror anthology published for the benefit of abused children in Europe and the U.S.

In 2002, while living with his wife in Cork, Ireland, Masterton added crime fiction to his repertoire with A Terrible Beauty featuring Irish Detective Superintendent Katie Maguire. This was republished in 2013 as White Bones and sold 100,000 ebook copies in a month. It was followed by further Katie Maguire adventures, Broken Angels (2013), Red Light (2014), "Taken For Dead" (2014), "Blood Sisters" (2015), "Buried" (2015), Living Death" (2016), "Dead Girls Dancing" (2016) and "Dead Men Whistling" (2018). In 2010, Masterton published Rules of Duel, a short novel from the early 1970s that he wrote in collaboration with William S. Burroughs (Burroughs has co-author credit).

In 2017, after a visit to Wolow, the maximum-security prison near Wrocław in southern Poland, Masterton set up the Graham Masterton Written in Prison Award (Nagroda Grahama Mastertona W Wiezieniu Pisane) for the inmates of all of Poland's penal institutions to enter a short story contest. The contest is now an annual event and is supported by the Polish Prison Service, the Wrocław Agglomeration for Culture and Sport, both Rebis and Albatros publishing houses and the Wrocław Library.

The Prix Graham Masterton is organized annually in Belgium by the publisher Marc Bailly for the best French horror novel and short story of the year. The first prize is a sculpture of a demon.

In 2019, Masterton was given a Lifetime Achievement Award by the Horror Writers' Association. In 2021, he was honoured by the city of Wrocław in Poland by having a bronze dwarf representing himself with a copy of his horror novel The Manitou placed on the pavement outside the Art Hotel on Kielbasnicza Street—one of nearly 600 dwarves which are a major tourist attraction.

Masterton is co-authoring short horror stories with Dawn G Harris and these have appeared in a collection "Days Of Utter Dread". He is also writing short horror stories based on Slavic mythology with a Polish psychologist Karolina Mogielska and the first of these "Mr Nobody" was published in "Phantasmagoria magazine 22."

Masterton won the Złoty Kościej Award for the best horror novel of 2023 "Szpital Filomeny" ("The House at Phantom Park").

== Personal life ==
Masterton lives in Surrey, England. His wife and agent Wiescka died on 27 April 2011, aged 65.

== Bibliography ==
=== Horror ===
- The Manitou, 1976 (adapted as the 1978 film The Manitou)
- The Djinn (featuring Harry Erskine of The Manitou series), 1977
- The Sphinx, 1978
- Charnel House, 1978
- The Devils of D-Day, 1978
- The Hell Candidate, 1981
- The Heirloom, 1981
- The Wells of Hell (loosely based on H. P. Lovecraft's short story "The Colour Out of Space"), 1981
- Tengu, 1983
- The Pariah, 1983
- Picture of Evil (based on Oscar Wilde's novel The Picture of Dorian Gray; also published in the U.K. as Family Portrait), 1985
- Death Trance, 1986
- Mirror (referencing Lewis Carroll's Through the Looking-Glass), 1988
- Ritual (published in the U.S. as Feast), 1988
- Walkers, 1989
- Master of Lies (also published in the U.K. as Black Angel; mentions Harry Erskine as a fictional character), 1991
- The Burning (also published in the U.K. as The Hymn), 1991
- Prey (based on H. P. Lovecraft's short story "The Dreams in the Witch House"), 1992
- The Sleepless, 1993
- Flesh & Blood, 1994
- Spirit (referencing Hans Christian Andersen's The Snow Queen), 1995
- The House That Jack Built, 1995
- The Chosen Child, 1996
- House of Bones, 1998
- The Doorkeepers, 2001
- Hair Raiser, 2001
- Trauma (also published in the U.K. as Bonnie Winter), 2001
- The Hidden World, 2003
- The Devil in Gray, 2004
- Unspeakable, 2004
- Descendant (the first book of a proposed series called Vampire Hunter), 2006
- Edgewise, 2006
- The 5th Witch, 2008
- Ghost Music, 2008
- Fire Spirit, 2010
- Panic (also published in the U.K. as Forest Ghost), 2013
- Community, 2014
- Scarlet Widow, 2015
- The House of a Hundred Whispers, 2020
- The Soul Stealer, 2022
- The House at Phantom Park, 2022

==== The Manitou/Harry Erskine series ====
1. The Manitou, 1976
2. The Djinn, 1977
3. Revenge of the Manitou, 1979
4. Burial, 1991
5. "Spirit Jump" (short story in Faces of Fear), 1996
6. Manitou Blood, 2005
7. Blind Panic, 2009
8. Plague of the Manitou, 2015

==== Night Warriors series ====
1. Night Warriors, 1987
2. Death Dream, 1988
3. Night Plague, 1991
4. Night Wars, 2006
5. The Ninth Nightmare, 2011

==== Rook series ====
1. Rook, 1997
2. Tooth and Claw, 1997
3. The Terror, 1998
4. Snowman, 1999
5. Swimmer, 2001
6. Darkroom, 2004
7. Demon's Door, 2010
8. Garden of Evil, 2012

==== Sissy Sawyer series ====
1. Touchy and Feely (also published as Ill Fortune, loosely based on the Beltway snipers), 2005
2. The Painted Man (also published as Death Mask), 2008
3. The Red Hotel, 2012

==== Nathan Underhill series ====
1. Basilisk, 2009
2. Petrified, 2011

==== Katie Maguire series ====
- 1. White Bones (also published as Katie Maguire and A Terrible Beauty), 2003
- 2. Broken Angels (also published as Voice of an Angel), 2012
- 3. Red Light, 2014
- 4. Taken for Dead, 2014
- 5. Blood Sisters, 2015
- 5.5 "Eye for an Eye" (short story), 2015
- 6. Buried, 2016
- 7. Living Death, 2016
- 7.5 "The Drowned" (short story), 2016
- 8. Dead Girls Dancing, 2016
- 9. Dead Men Whistling, 2018
- 10. Begging to Die, 2019
- 11. The Last Drop of Blood, 2020
- 12. Pay Back the Devil, 2024

==== Patel & Pardoe Series ====
- Ghost Virus, 2018
- The Children God Forgot, 2021
- The Shadow People, 2022
- What Hides in the Cellar, 2023
- House of Flies, 2025

=== Historical fiction ===
- Heartbreaker (published as by Katherine Winston), 1978
- Rich, 1979
- Railroad (also published as Man of Destiny), 1981
- Solitaire, 1982
- Corroboree, 1984
- Maiden Voyage, 1984
- Lady of Fortune, 1984
- Headlines, 1986
- Silver, 1987
- Lords of the Air, 1988
- Empress, 1990

=== Thrillers ===
- Fireflash 5 (also published as A Mile Before Morning), 1977
- Plague, 1977
- The Sweetman Curve, 1979
- Famine, 1981
- Ikon, 1983
- Condor, 1984
- Sacrifice, 1985
- Genius (also published as Kingdom of the Blind), 1998
- Holy Terror (also published as Plague of Terror), 1999
- Innocent Blood (also published as Outrage), 2004
- Chaos Theory, 2007
- Rules of Duel (co-credited to William S. Burroughs), 2010 (written between 1964 and 1970)
- Drought, 2014

=== Confessions series ===
- Confessions of a Wanton Waitress, 1975
- Confessions of a Racy Receptionist, 1976

=== Movie tie-ins ===
- Inserts (as Anton Rimart), 1976
- Phobia (as Thomas Luke), 1980

=== ...of Fear—short story collections ===
- Fortnight of Fear, 1994
- Flights of Fear, 1995
- Faces of Fear, 1996
- Feelings of Fear, 2000
- Festival of Fear, 2005
- Figures of Fear, 2014

=== Short stories ===
- "Absence of Beast"
- "Anaïs"
- "Anka"
- "A Polite Murder"
- "A Portrait of Kasia"
- "The Ballyhooly Boy"
- "Beijing Craps"
- "Beholder"
- "Bridal Suite"
- "The Burgers of Calais"
- "Camelot"
- "Changeling"
- "Cheeseboy"
- "Cold Turkey"
- "Cutting The Mustard" (with Dawn G Harris)
- "Dog Days"
- "Eau Noire"
- "Edgewise" (also published as "Night of the Wendigo"; short story not directly related to the novel of the same name, although it features the character of John Shooks, serialized in issues #3, 4 and 5 of The Horror Express magazine, edited by Marc Shemmans)
- "Egg"
- "Eric the Pie"
- "Ever, Ever After"
- "Evidence of Angels"
- "Fairy Story"
- "5A Bedford Row"
- "Friend in Need"
- "The Grey Madonna"
- "Grease Monkey"
- "Grief"
- "Half-Sick of Shadows"
- "The Heart of Helen Day"
- "Heart of Stone"
- "Heroine"
- "The Hungry Moon"
- "Hurry Monster"
- "I, The Martian"
- "J.R.E. Ponsford"
- "Jack Be Quick"
- "The Jajouka Penis-Beetle"
- "Laird of Dunain"
- "Lolicia"
- "Making Belinda"
- "Men of Maes"
- "Mother of Invention"
- "Mr Nobody" (with Karolina Mogielska)
- "National Balance"
- "Neighbors From Hell"
- "On Gracious Pond"
- "Out of Her Depth"
- "Picnic at Lac Du Sang"
- "Pig's Dinner"
- "Roadkill"
- "The Red Butcher of Wroclaw"
- "Rococo"
- "The Root of All Evil"
- "Rug"
- "Saint Joan"
- "Saving Grace"
- "The Scrawler"
- "The Secret Shih-Tan"
- "Sepsis"
- "Sex Object"
- "The Sixth Man"
- "Son of Beast"
- "Spirit Jump"
- "Spirits of the Age"
- "St. Bronach's Shrift"
- "Stranglehold" (with Dawn G Harris)
- "Suffer Kate"
- "The Sympathy Society"
- "The Taking of Mr. Bill"
- "Underbed"
- "Voodoo Child"
- "Will" (Cthulhu Mythos pastiche; features Yog-Sothoth)
- "The Woman in the Wall"

=== Sex instruction books ===
- Acts of Love (published as by Dr. Jan Berghoff), 1971
- Your Erotic Fantasies (published as by Edward Thorne), 1971
- Girls Who Said Yes (published as by Edward Thorne), 1973
- How a Woman Longs to be Loved (published as by Angel Smith), 1974
- How to be the Perfect Lover, 1975
- Isn't It Time You Did Something Kinky? (published as by Angel Smith), 1975
- Sex is Everything (published as by Edward Thorne), 1975
- How to be a Good Bad Girl (published as by Angel Smith), 1976
- Women's Erotic Dreams (and What They Mean), 1976
- 1,001 Erotic Dreams Interpreted, 1976
- How to Drive Your Man Wild in Bed, 1976
- How to Drive Your Woman Wild in Bed, 1987
- The High Intensity Sex Plan, 1977
- More Ways to Drive Your Man Wild in Bed, 1985
- Sex Secrets of the Other Woman, 1989
- How to Drive Your Lover Wild in Bed (a combination of How to Drive Your Man Wild in Bed and How to Drive Your Woman Wild in Bed), 1989
- How to Make Love Six Nights a Week, 1991
- Wild in Bed Together, 1992
- Drive Him Wild, 1993
- Single, Wild, Sexy...and Safe, 1994
- How to Drive Your Man Even Wilder in Bed, 1995
- How to Make His Wildest Dreams Come True, 1996
- Secrets of the Sexually Irresistible Woman, 1998
- The Seven Secrets of Really Great Sex, 1999
- The Secrets of Sexual Play, 1999
- Wild Sex for New Lovers, 2001
- Up All Night, 2004

== Awards ==
Year	Award	Category	Work	Result	Ref.
1979	Edgar Allan Poe Award	Paperback Original	Charnel House	Nominated	
1996	Bram Stoker Award	Short Fiction	The Secret Shih Tan	Nominated	
1996	International Horror Guild Award	Short Fiction	Underbed	Won	
1997	World Fantasy Award	Short Fiction	Underbed	Nominated	
1999	World Fantasy Award	Collection	Manitou Man: The Worlds of Graham Masterton	Nominated	
2003	Edgar Allan Poe Award	Paperback Original	Trauma	Nominated	
2018	Bram Stoker Award	Lifetime Achievement Award	-	Won	
