= Bloxham Stockbrokers =

Former Irish Stockbroking firm

- Industry: Stockbroking
- Headquarters: Dublin, Ireland
- Key people: Pramit Ghose (Managing Partner); Tadhg Gunnell (CFO/Head of Finance)

Bloxham Stockbrokers was the oldest Irish stockbroking firm and was a member of both the Irish and London Stock Exchanges. It was a founder member of the Irish Stock Exchange.

Bloxham was the oldest stockbroking firm in Ireland and could trace its roots back over 150 years.

Bloxham operated across three regions with an office in the Irish Financial Service Centre in Dublin, Limerick and claimed to be Ireland's largest independent stockbroker, with most of its clients, by number, being retail investors. The firm provided both stockbroking and wealth management services to private and institutional clients.

Kieran Wallace of KPMG was appointed liquidator in June 2012. Davy Group later acquired the private client business of Bloxhams.

In July 2024, two former Partners in the firm, Pramit Ghose and Patrick Dempsey offered €150,000 and €45,000 towards settling the outstanding liquidation and wind-up costs while the other partners were assessed as having no assets or minimal assets to contribute.

== See also ==
- Custom House Capital
