= Brendan McWilliams =

Irish meteorologist (1944–2007)

- Born: 7 August 1944; Dublin, Ireland
- Died: 22 October 2007 (aged 63); Wexford, Ireland
- Occupations: Meteorologist and writer

Brendan McWilliams (7 August 1944 – 22 October 2007) was an Irish meteorologist and science writer. He was born in Dublin in 1944 but grew up in Waterville, County Kerry where his father was in charge of the Valentia Observatory. He graduated in mathematical science from University College Cork (UCC) in 1964. He joined the Irish Meteorological Service in 1965 and worked as a weather forecaster, first at Shannon Airport and later at the Central Analysis and Forecast Office in Dublin. During the 1970s he was a regular presenter of the daily weather forecast on Raidió Teilifís Éireann (RTÉ) television.

In 1978, Brendan McWilliams became Head of the Meteorological Service at Dublin Airport, and from 1981 to 1990 he was Head of Administration at Met Éireann, the Irish Meteorological Service. In 1987 he obtained an MBA from the National University of Ireland Dublin and became deputy director of Met Éireann in 1990. He was appointed as Director of Administration of the European Meteorological Satellite Organisation based in Germany in 1998 and retired in 2004.

Brendan McWilliams's daily "Weather Eye" column in The Irish Times, began in 1988 and became one of the most popular features of the newspaper. For the last year of his life he made a weekly live contribution to Today with Pat Kenny on RTÉ Radio 1.

He died peacefully, after a short illness, on 22 October 2007.

== Bibliography ==
- McWilliams, Brendan (1994). Weather Eye. Dublin: The Lilliput Press. ISBN 978-1-874675-55-6
- McWilliams, Brendan (1999). A Weather Eye on Literature. Dublin: The Lilliput Press. ISBN 978-1-901866-41-4
- McWilliams, Brendan (2008). McWilliams, Anne (ed.). The Book of Weather Eye: An Anthology. Dublin: Gill & * Macmillan. ISBN 978-0-7171-4433-4
- McWilliams, Brendan (2009). McWilliams, Anne (ed.). Weather Eye: The Final Year. Dublin: Gill & Macmillan. ISBN 978-0-7171-4623-9
