= Eamon Law =

Eamon Law (died 2007) was an Irish handball player for Kilkenny and Mullinavat.

== Playing career ==
Eamon won both the 60 x 30 and 40 x 20 doubles with D. J. Carey at minor level in 1988 and 1989. He also won the All-Ireland Novice Singles title and a 60 x 30 Intermediate title with clubman Pierce O'Keefe. In 2007, Law won the 40 x 20 doubles title with Eddie Burke and was later defeated in the All-Ireland final against Tyrone. Law won a junior hardball doubles champion in 1999 with Eddie Burke. He also won national league medals with Kilkenny and a 40 x 20 under-21 doubles with Graham O'Brien in 1991. Michael 'Ducksy' Walsh of Kilkenny has organised a new tournament entitled 'Eamon Law Memorial Handball Tournament' which will be held at Law's Millinavat club in his native County Kilkenny.

== Death ==
Eamon had just started playing a singles match at the Talbots Inch handball alley on the Freshford Road in Kilkenny, he collapsed and died on the handball court, aged 37. He was later pronounced dead when brought to St Luke's hospital in Kilkenny. He was married with two children.
