= Famine (Masterton novel) =

1981 novel by Graham Masterton

- First edition (publ. Sphere Books)
- Author: Graham Masterton
- Language: English
- Publication date: 1981

Famine is a 1981 horror novel written by Scottish writer Graham Masterton. The story is about a nationwide famine that sweeps America, rendering all sources of food contaminated in one way or another.

The plot revolves around Ed Hardesty, a wheat farmer who owns South Burlington Farm, Kingman County, Kansas and his attempt to find out the cause of the blight that has stricken his wheat crop, as well as every other crop in the United States.
