= Night Warriors (novel) =

1986 novel by Graham Masterton

Night Warriors is a novel by Graham Masterton published in 1986.

== Plot summary ==
Night Warriors is a novel in which dangerous creatures prey on the living. A great beast of evil and lust has been released upon the California coast line, preying upon the dreams of the innocent. The only hope to prevent a massive demonic incursion lies with four unsuspecting strangers and a mysterious being who promises them power to take on the mantle of their ancestors, the Night Warriors, and follow their demonic quarry into the realm of dreams. Armed with deadly real weapons of high fantasy and dream, the Night Warriors stake their all on hunting the progeny of the devil itself.

== Reception ==
Dave Langford reviewed Night Warriors for White Dwarf #86, and stated that "nasty all right, but short on stuff like suspense, coherence, credibility."

== Reviews ==
- Review by Gary Zacharias (1987) in Fantasy Review, March 1987
- Review by Don D'Ammassa (1987) in Science Fiction Chronicle, #96 September 1987
- Review by Lee Montgomerie (1987) in Interzone, #20 Summer 1987
- Review [French] by Jérôme-Olivier Allard (2009) in Solaris, #172
