= Kevin Reynolds (priest) =

Irish Catholic priest

The Reverend Kevin Reynolds
- Known for: Being falsely accused of child sexual abuse
- Religion: Christianity (Roman Catholic)
- Church: Latin Church
- Ordained: 1971

Kevin Reynolds is an Irish Catholic priest who was falsely alleged in a news feature on RTÉ (the national television network of Ireland) to have raped and impregnated a Kenyan teenager. A scandal ensued when the allegations were discovered to be untrue, which generated intensive media coverage and political debate in Ireland, resulting in a government inquiry into the broadcaster.

The allegations were made in a report by the journalist Aoife Kavanagh titled "Mission to Prey", which aired in May 2011 on the Prime Time programme. Kavanagh alleged that during his time as a missionary in Kenya, Reynolds had raped and impregnated a minor named Veneraanda, fathering a child called Sheila. Kavanagh also alleged that Reynolds had secretly provided financial support to Sheila over a number of years. Both Veneranda and Sheila were interviewed on the programme to corroborate the allegations. taken place in the Diocese of Kakamega in Kenya.

Prior to the broadcasting of the show, Reynolds volunteered to have DNA testing undertaken to prove his innocence but this offer was refused by RTÉ. Later, two separate and independent DNA tests established that Reynolds was not the father of the child. With this it emerged that the allegations were entirely baseless. However, as a result of the broadcast, Reynolds was removed from his home and his parish ministry.

When it became public knowledge that Reynolds had been falsely accused, RTÉ broadcast an apology to him. Prime Time Investigates, the series on which the allegations were broadcast, was immediately suspended. The Director-General of RTÉ, Noel Curran, admitted the broadcasting of "Mission to Prey" was "one of the gravest editorial mistakes ever made" at RTÉ. RTÉ staff, including Mike Murphy, John Bowman, and Sean O'Rourke, publicly criticised the libel. The head of the Irish Missionary Union said that Aoife Kavanagh's continuing presence on Morning Ireland after being found guilty of defaming Reynolds was "unfair and unjust" and a demonstration of "double standards" in the media.

In November 2011, Reynolds agreed to an out-of-court libel settlement with RTÉ. The amount of the settlement was not disclosed. His solicitor also requested that the Irish justice minister, Alan Shatter, "clarify that he accepts that Fr Reynolds was guilty of no wrongdoing", in response to Shatter's previous public support of "Mission to Prey" when it was broadcast in May 2011.

== See also ==
- False allegation of child sexual abuse
