= Eoin Neeson =

Irish journalist, historian, novelist and playwright

- Neeson in 1968
- Born: 13 September 1927; Cork, Ireland
- Died: 2 January 2011 (aged 83); Dublin, Ireland
- Occupations: Journalist; Historian; Writer

Eoin Neeson (13 September 1927 – 2 January 2011) was an Irish journalist, historian, novelist and playwright.

== Life and career ==
Born to a staunch republican Cork family, Neeson was the son of Seán Neeson, station director for 6CK, the first official radio station in Cork, and his wife Geraldine Sullivan, a classical pianist and music critic for The Irish Times. Neeson was educated in the Christian Brothers College, Cork, and Newbridge College, Co Kildare. After school he joined the Irish Air Corps where he remained for 2 years. But he had always wanted to write and so after that he joined various provincial presses and rose to editor of The Kerryman and managing editor of the Munster Tribune. He worked his way to being recruited for the new television station Telifís Éireann. He worked as a news reporter there until he finally left to become chief press officer of the national transport company CIÉ. His final role was as director of the Government Information Bureau succeeding Pádraig Ó hAnnracháin. He lived in Blackrock, Dublin and died after a long illness.

== Bibliography ==
=== Mythology ===
- The Book of Irish Saints (Cork, [1967]), 238pp.;
- The First Book of Irish Myths and Legends (Cork: Mercier Press, 1965)
- The Second Book of Irish Legends (Cork: Mercier Press 1966)
- Celtic Myths and Legends (Cork: Mercier Press 1998)
- Deirdre and Other Great Stories from Celtic Mythology (Mainstream 1998)

=== History ===
- The Civil War in Ireland, 1922-23 (Cork Mercier 1966, 1969; Dublin: Poolbeg 1989)
- The Life and Death of Michael Collins (Cork, 1968)
- Birth of a Republic (Dublin: Prestige 1998)
- Myths of 1916 (Aubane Hist. Soc. 2007)
- The Battle of Crossbarry (Aubane Hist. Soc. 2008)

=== Miscellaneous ===
- A History of Irish Forestry (Dublin: Lilliput Press 1991)
- Aspects of Parallelism in Japanese and Irish Character and Culture [Hosei Daigaku, Inst. of Comp. Econ. Studies; No. 29: Ireland-Japan papers, No. 8] (Tokyo: Hosei UP 1992)
