= Famine (album) =

Studio album by Graves of Valor
- Released: September 11th 2007
- Recorded: 2007
- Genre: Death Metal
- Length: 24:07
- Label: Tragic Hero Records

Professional ratings
Review scores
Source	Rating
Sputnik Music	4.5/4.5 stars
Lambgoat	7/10 stars

Famine is the first official release by Death Metal act Graves of Valor it was released September 11, 2007, via Tragic Hero Records On May 30, 2006, Graves of Valor released two demo tracks to their Myspace page entitled "Architect" and "Kiss the Snake" The full Track listing was released soon after.

== Personnel ==
- David Hasselbring - Bass
- Jeff Springs - Guitar
- Richard Turbeville - Guitar
- Dayton Cantley - Drums
- Damon Welch - Vocals
