= Tony Sweeney =

Tony Sweeney (c.1931 – 4 December 2012) was a famous Irish horse racing journalist. He first worked at the Daily Mirror in 1956 and left in 1997. In 1964, Sweeney became RTÉ's sports commentator through 1998. He later worked at The Irish Times in 1998 and wrote about famous horse racing stories from over 250 years ago, which made him very resourceful. In 2002, Sweeney along with his wife Annie completed the Sweeney Guide To The Irish Turf 1501-2001 which was almost 650-pages full.

== Awards ==
Sweeney was inducted into racing's hall of fame in 2002 and in 2007, Sweeney was awarded Horse Racing Ireland’s “Contribution to the Industry”.

He is survived by his son Nick. His wife, Annie, predeceased him.
