= Hal Roach (comedian) =

Irish comedian

- Born: John Roche; November 4, 1927; Waterford, Ireland
- Died: February 28, 2012 (aged 84)

Comedy career
- Years active: 1944–2012
- Medium: Singer, magician, comedian
- Genre: Observational comedy

Hal Roach (4 November 1927 – 28 February 2012) was a prominent Irish comedian. He spent over 60 years in show business as a live performer, having also recorded albums, DVDs and was featured in the Guinness World Records for the longest-running engagement of a comedian at the same venue: 26 years at Jury's Irish Cabaret, Jury's Ballsbridge Hotel, Dublin. Despite having the same first and last name, he is not related to the pioneering comedy film producer of the same name known for his work with Laurel and Hardy, The Little Rascals, and Harold Lloyd.

== Early life ==
Born John Roche in Waterford, where he attended the Manor Christian Brothers school, Roche began his career after winning a local talent competition as a boy soprano. He initially toured with an illusionist and specialised in magic, but later moved to comedy.

== Comedy ==
A typical Hal Roach joke is as follows: "He told me that I have a cult following, at least I think that's what he said".

Another- "There is a man sitting in the middle of the road casting his fishing line... now none of us is perfect, but c'mon! So I asked him, "How many have you caught today?" He said, "You're the ninth."

Perhaps his most famous catchphrase is "Write it down, it's a good one!".

He was a regular panelist on the 1970s RTÉ television show What's My Line? which was based on the original American version of the same name.

Roach has been cited as a major influence by other comedians such as Brendan Grace.

== Death ==
After suffering from a long bout of ill health, Roach died on 28 February 2012. The following month, RTÉ broadcast a tribute to Roach in one of its graveyard slots, a repeat airing of a programme from the That's Entertainment series first broadcast in 1972.

== Recordings ==
=== Albums ===
- The King of Blarney Irish Records
- We Irish Talk Like That Irish Records/Ceol
- He Must Be Joking Irish Records/Ceol/Rajon
- I Think I'm Having One of My Turns Cabaret Records
- An Audience With Irish Records/Ceol/Rajon
- The Best of Irish Humour Grainne Music/Ceol/Rajon
- Hal Roach & Friends Ovation
- Write It Down Grainne Music/Rajon
- It's That Man Again! Grainne Music/Rajon
- He's at It Again Grainne Music/BMG/Rajon

=== DVDs/videos ===
- Hal Roach It's himself Live at Jurys Cabaret Sony BMG
- An Audience With Hal Roach, The King of Blarney Emdee
- Hal Roach The King of Irish Comedy (2005) Irish Records (double-DVD)
- Tony Kenny's Ireland - The Green Island (guest appearance)

== Books ==
- Ireland's International Comedian: Hal Roach (His Greatest Collection of Irish Humour and Wit, featuring the "Unnecessary Sayings" of the Irish in conversation) (1995) Folens
- Party Laughs (1995) Grainne Music
