= Aoife Kavanagh =

Irish journalist (born 1969)

- Born: 1969 (age 56–57)
- Education: University College, Dublin
- Occupations: Journalist; documentary producer

Aoife Kavanagh (born 1969) is an Irish independent journalist and documentary producer. She was previously a reporter and presenter for RTÉ, working on both radio and television, with a particular interest in foreign news and international development stories. She resigned from RTÉ in the wake of the "Mission to Prey" documentary for Prime Time that resulted in a libel payment to Kevin Reynolds. She has since gone on to make a number of documentaries with Frontline Films in Dublin, including "The (Un)teachables", "Schizophrenia, Voices in My Head", and "I Am Traveller".

== Education/early career ==
Kavanagh graduated with an honours degree in communications from the Dublin Institute of Technology. She worked as a reporter with "The Cork Examiner", now "The Irish Examiner." She has a master's degree in International Relations from University College Dublin.

== Reporter/presenter with RTÉ ==
She started working as a reporter on RTÉ's flagship "Morning Ireland" radio programme in 1996. She went on to edit a number of RTÉ's radio news programmes, including "This Week" and "World Report" as well as presenting "Morning Ireland," "The News at One" and "This Week." During her time in RTÉ, she made a five-part documentary series on the impact of Irish Government aid on developing countries. She was posted to Nairobi, in Kenya, for six months to spearhead RTÉ's Africa coverage. Among the stories she covered during her time in RTÉ were the conflict in East Timor, the Asian tsunami and the 2004 presidential election in the United States.

== Defamation and resignation ==
In 2011, a defamation/libel suit was filed against RTÉ following a "Prime Time Investigates" report called 'Mission To Prey,' on which Kavanagh was the reporter. The suit against the national broadcaster was settled for an undisclosed sum.

RTÉ later broadcast an apology to Fr Kevin Reynolds.

RTÉ was fined €200,000 by the Broadcasting Authority of Ireland (BAI) as a result of the defamation of Fr Kevin Reynolds following what the BAI said were serious breaches of the Broadcasting Act 2009. Kavanagh resigned from RTÉ on 4 May 2012. She had previously been tipped as a replacement for Charlie Bird in the role of RTÉ's US Correspondent after he left the States.

== Documentaries ==
Since leaving RTÉ, Aoife Kavanagh has worked on a number of award-winning documentaries. In her role as producer with "Frontline Films" she made the programme "I Am Traveller," which was nominated for an Irish Film and Television Award in 2016. Her documentary about schizophrenia, “Schizophrenia, Voices In My Head” was nominated for two IFTA's as well as a Celtic Media Award in 2017. "The (Un)teachables," was the winner of the Headline Mental Health Media Awards in 2020. She was the producer of "The John Delaney Story," which aired on RTÉ in November 2020.
