= Mission to Prey =

- Genre: "Undercover journalism"
- Created by: RTÉ News
- Starring: Aoife Kavanagh
- Country of origin: Ireland

Original release
- Network: RTÉ One
- Release: 23 May 2011

Related
- Prime Time; The Frontline

"Mission to Prey" is the title of an episode of the RTÉ programme Prime Time Investigates broadcast in May 2011. It falsely accused an Irish Catholic priest in Kenya of having fathered a child by engaging in child sexual abuse. The Broadcasting Authority of Ireland fined the RTÉ as a result and the decision to air the programme was described as "one of the gravest editorial mistakes ever made" in the history of RTÉ broadcasting.

== The broadcast ==
In January 2011 reporter Aoife Kavanagh and producer Mark Lappin, on a research trip to Kenya, believed they had found evidence of a sexual scandal involving Fr. Kevin Reynolds, an Irish Catholic priest. Their sources accused Fr. Kevin Reynolds of raping a teenage girl and fathering her child in Kenya. The (alleged) mother of the child verified these allegations. After a second research trip by the two, the executive producer of Prime Time Investigates, the editor of current affairs, and the managing director of News all agreed to broadcast the programme. A later investigation identified their actions as "groupthink" – all members of the team responsible for the broadcast believed that Father Reynolds was guilty. The RTÉ legal department also vetted the program and, despite misgivings, agreed with broadcasting the programme. An offer by Father Reynolds to carry out a paternity test was ignored by the RTÉ team.

The programme caused uproar across Ireland when the truth was later revealed. As a result of the broadcast, Fr. Reynolds was removed from his home and from his parish ministry and his reputation was destroyed. It subsequently emerged that the allegations were false and that RTÉ had defamed Fr. Kevin Reynolds. Director-General of RTÉ Noel Curran admitted the broadcasting of "Mission to Prey" was "one of the gravest editorial mistakes ever made" in RTÉ's history.

== Consequences ==
Prime Times Investigates was initially suspended as a result of the scandal and it was later announced that the program would be terminated and replaced with a different investigative program. The fact that such damaging material could be aired on the national television network without adequate prior fact-checking caused a political scandal in Ireland, and the Irish government ordered a government inquiry into the matter (one of four separate investigations into the broadcast). RTÉ's managing director of news Ed Mulhall and current affairs editor Ken O'Shea were replaced by Cillian de Paor and Steve Carson respectively. Ed Mulhall retired, while O'Shea and others connected with the program were later assigned to other duties in RTÉ. In November 2011, the head of the Irish Missionary Union had said Kavanagh's continuing presence on Morning Ireland after being found guilty of defaming Fr. Kevin Reynolds was "unfair and unjust" and a demonstration of "double standards" in the media. However, Kavanagh waited the six months until the formal investigation report was published and resigned on the day that the Broadcasting Authority of Ireland's report was issued in May 2012.

Justice Minister Alan Shatter initially supported "Mission to Prey" after it was broadcast in May 2011, and released a public statement of praise after it was aired, which he later retracted.

As a result of RTÉ's defamation of Fr. Kevin Reynolds, the family of a deceased Christian Brother, accused by RTÉ in the same Mission to Prey programme of having abused children, asked that his name also be cleared. There were calls for RTÉ to justify all allegations it had made against missionaries and there was a "danger that the national broadcaster could be damaged far beyond what is necessary".

== RTÉ apology controversy ==
RTÉ refused to accept DNA evidence that Fr Reynolds was innocent and he was forced to take action. After the High Court found that the accusations were baseless and defamatory RTÉ were forced into apologizing to Fr Reynolds and paying substantial damages.

There was a "public backlash" over the standard of the televised apology. Among the most outspoken critics of RTÉ's botched apology was Fr. Sean McDonagh of the Association of Catholic Priests. RTÉ staff also expressed their ire during a showdown with Noel Curran. RTÉ rebroadcast the apology to Fr. Kevin Reynolds after the Nine O'Clock News on 25 November 2011 which it described as "in response to concerns expressed by viewers".

RTÉ staff, including Mike Murphy, John Bowman and Sean O'Rourke, publicly criticised the serious libel.

== BAI report ==
RTÉ was fined €200,000 by the Broadcasting Authority of Ireland (BAI) as a result of the defamation of Fr Kevin Reynolds following what the BAI said were serious breaches of the Broadcasting Act 2009. The BAI's report found that "Second-hand repetition of gossip appears to have been treated as corroboration, as Ms Kavanagh did not appear to have met or questioned colleagues who according to the primary source, were aware of the allegations". Aoife Kavanagh resigned from RTÉ on 4 May 2012.

== Burke suit ==
Richard Anthony Burke was accused in the same program of underage sex in Nigeria. He sued RTÉ for libel in 2015, claiming he and the accuser had only had adult consensual sex. RTÉ settled out of court, claiming to have paid part of Burke's costs but no damages.

== See also ==
- False allegation of child sexual abuse
- Catholic sexual abuse scandal in Ireland
- Roman Catholic sex abuse cases by country
