= Emerald Futsal League =

- Founded: 2008
- Country: (Republic of Ireland) Ireland
- Level on pyramid: 1
- Domestic cup: FAI Futsal Cup
- International cup: UEFA Futsal Cup

The Emerald Futsal League was a futsal league featuring teams based in the Republic of Ireland. It was initially planned that the league would develop into a full national league. However the vast majority of its member clubs were based in the Greater Dublin Area. It was effectively a provincial league and, as a result, was also referred to as the Emerald Futsal League (Leinster). The league was introduced in 2008 and the inaugural winners were Brasilforall. Teams from the league did not automatically qualify for the UEFA Futsal Cup but could qualify by winning the FAI Futsal Cup. Since the Emerald Futsal League disbanded, the AUL Futsal Premier League became the top tier of Irish futsal.

== History ==
The Emerald Futsal League was founded in 2008 as a joint partnership project involving four organisations – the Futsal Association of Ireland, Futsal Ireland, Sport Against Racism Ireland and Dublin City Council. The league kicked off on 2 November 2008 with three games played at the Ballyfermot Leisure Centre. The participants included Brasilforall, Polish Eagles, Futsamba, Perestroika, English in Dublin and Dublin Futsal. The inaugural champions were Brasilforall who were subsequently taken over by St Patrick's Athletic. The 2009 Emerald Futsal League kicked off on 25 June 2009 with four games played at the BRL Umbro Arena, Ballymun. Dublin Santos played Shamrock Rovers in the first game. Other members this season included Sporting Fingal, St Patrick's Athletic, Bray/St Joseph's, Alpha United, ISL Futsal and North County Dublin. In October 2009 Shamrock Rovers won the second Emerald Futsal League title after a 7–4 win in the final against Bray/St Joseph's. Since 2010 Emerald Futsal League teams have competed in the FAI Futsal Cup. Emerald Futsal League teams can also qualify to compete in the UEFA Futsal Cup after winning the FAI Futsal Cup. Shamrock Rovers and St Patrick's Athletic qualified for the 2007–08 and 2008–09 tournaments before the Emerald Futsal League started. Playing under various names including, Sporting Fingal EID, EID Futsal and Eden College, Eden Futsal Club qualified for the UEFA Futsal Cup on five consecutive occasions between 2010–11 and 2014–15. Blue Magic Futsal qualified for the 2015–16 and 2016–17 tournaments.

== Format ==
The league consisted of a regular league season plus a series of play-off matches to decide the eventual champions.

== Teams ==
=== 2014–15 season ===
As of 2016:

Team	Home city/suburb	Court
Academic Futsal	Dublin	
B&H United Futsal	Dublin	
Blue Magic Futsal	Clondalkin	Collinstown Park Community College
Crumlin United Futsal	Crumlin, Dublin	
Puskas & Hagi Futsal	Dublin	
St Ita's Futsal	Donabate/Portrane	Donabate and Portrane Community and Leisure Centre
Saints & Scholars Futsal	Whitechurch, County Dublin	St Columba's College
Transylvania Futsal	Blanchardstown	IT Blanchardstown

=== Previous seasons ===
Team	Home city/suburb	Court
Academic Futsal Club		
Alpha Futsal		
AUL Futsal		
B&H United Futsal		
Blue Magic Futsal	Clondalkin	Collinstown Park Community College
Bray/St Joseph's	Bray/Sallynoggin	
Brasilforall		
Clonskeagh Futsal	Clonskeagh	
Clontarf Athletic	Clontarf, Dublin	
Crumlin United Futsal	Crumlin, Dublin	
DiaEuro Futsal	Dublin	National Sports Campus
Eden Futsal Club	Blanchardstown	IT Blanchardstown
FC Guillermo Futsal		
5th Infantry Battalion	Cabra, Dublin	McKee Barracks
ISL Futsal		
Lifford		
Newton Heath Futsal	Clondalkin	Collinstown Park Community College
North County Dublin		
Polish Eagles	Dublin	
Puskas & Hagi Futsal	Dublin	
Rivervalley Rangers	Donabate	
SARSI Futsal Club		
Shamrock Rovers	Tallaght	National Basketball Arena
Saints & Scholars Futsal	Whitechurch, County Dublin	St Columba's College
St Ita's Futsal	Donabate/Portrane	Donabate and Portrane Community and Leisure Centre
St Patrick's Athletic		
St Vincent's Deaf		
Street Leagues		
Transylvania Futsal	Blanchardstown	IT Blanchardstown
Wicklow Futsal Club		

== Winners ==
Season	Winner	Score	Runner-up	Venue
2008	Brasilforall			
2009	Shamrock Rovers	7–4	Bray/St Joseph's	BRL Umbro Arena, Ballymun
2010	Shamrock Rovers		Dublin Santos	
2011	EID Futsal	3–1	Shamrock Rovers	National Basketball Arena
2012				
2013			Eden College	
2013–14	Eden	6–5	Transylvania	National Basketball Arena
2014–15	Transylvania	5–3	Blue Magic	National Basketball Arena
2015–16				
2016–17				
