= List of Republic of Ireland national futsal team matches =

List of Republic of Ireland national futsal team matches.

== 1983 ==
16 July 1983 Group B	Republic of Ireland	4–1	Belgium	Rome, Italy; Nations Futsal Cup

17 July 1983 Group B	Republic of Ireland	3–4	Czechoslovakia	Rome, Italy; Nations Futsal Cup

18 July 1983 3rd/4th Place Play off	Republic of Ireland	7–2	England	Rome, Italy; Nations Futsal Cup

== 2001 ==
21 June 2001	Republic of Ireland	4–5	Scotland	Friendly

22 June 2001	Republic of Ireland	5–5	Scotland	Friendly

23 June 2001	Republic of Ireland	6–5	Scotland	Friendly

== 2002 ==
9 February 2002	(Note: Also referred to as Dublin Select.) Republic of Ireland	2–4	Scotland	St Columba's College, Dublin; Masita Cup

9 February 2002	Republic of Ireland	v	Northern Ireland	St Columba's College, Dublin; Masita Cup

9 February 2002	Republic of Ireland	v	(England) Tranmere Victoria (Note: England represented by Tranmere Victoria, a club team.)	St Columba's College, Dublin; Masita Cup

October 2002	Republic of Ireland	2–1	Scotland (Note: Also referred as the Scottish Futsal League.)	Chester, England; British Isles Nations Futsal Cup

October 2002	Republic of Ireland	2–2	Northern Ireland	Chester, England; British Isles Nations Futsal Cup

October 2002	Republic of Ireland	3–3	Gibraltar (Note: Also referred as the Gibraltar Futsal League.)	Chester, England; British Isles Nations Futsal Cup

October 2002	(Note: England represented by Tranmere Victoria, a club team.) Tranmere Victoria (England)	3–1	Republic of Ireland	Chester, England; British Isles Nations Futsal Cup

== 2008 ==
3 December 2008	Hungary	4–1	(Republic of Ireland) Republic of Ireland	Miskolc Varosi Sportusarnok Arena
	Lodi ?' ?'; Gyurcsanyi ?'; Berkes ?'	Report	Lynch ?'	Attendance: 1500; Referee: Friendly

? December 2008	Hungary	v	(Republic of Ireland) Republic of Ireland
		Report		Referee: Friendly

19 December 2008	England	3–3	(Republic of Ireland) Republic of Ireland	Loughborough University; Four Nations Futsal Cup
19.30	Ursell 5' 27'; Ballinger 23'	Report	D. Massey 19' 20'; Langtry 36'	Stadium: Sir David Wallace Building; Attendance: 200; Referee: Craig Grundy (England)

20 December 2008	Libya	4–0	(Republic of Ireland) Republic of Ireland	Loughborough University; Four Nations Futsal Cup
16.00		Report

21 December 2008	Lithuania	3–1	(Republic of Ireland) Republic of Ireland	Loughborough University; Four Nations Futsal Cup
14.00		Report

== 2009 ==
19 February 2009 Group A	Republic of Ireland	0–2	Cyprus	National Basketball Arena; 2010 UEFA Futsal qualifier
19.00		Report	Polyviou 19'; Vassiliou 28'

20 February 2009 Group A	Republic of Ireland	2–0	England	National Basketball Arena; 2010 UEFA Futsal qualifier
19.00	L. Massey 1'; McDonagh 37'	Report

22 February 2009 Group A	Republic of Ireland	0–5	Kazakhstan	National Basketball Arena; 2010 UEFA Futsal qualifier
18.00		Report

21 October 2009	France	4–1	(Republic of Ireland) Republic of Ireland	Toulouse, France; Friendly
	Texeira 10'; Ait Kahma 24'; Basson 27'; Mendy 36'	Report	Lynch 35'	Stadium: Palais des Sports; Attendance: 1500; Referee: Pascal Fritz (France)

22 October 2009	France	6–1	(Republic of Ireland) Republic of Ireland	Toulouse, France; Friendly
	Mendy 5' 15'; Otmani 27'; Basson 31'; Teixeira 37'; Ait-Khama 40'	Report	McDonagh 17'	Stadium: Palais des Sports; Attendance: 1000; Referee: Ludovic Zmyslony (France)

== 2010 ==
30 March 2010	Republic of Ireland	1–2	Norway (Note: This was Norway's first senior international.)	National Basketball Arena; Friendly
20.00

31 March 2010	Republic of Ireland	1–2	Norway	National Basketball Arena; Friendly
20.00	Langtry 38'	Report	? 1'; Sether 40'

13 December 2010	Finland	5–0	(Republic of Ireland) Republic of Ireland	Tampere, Finland; Friendly

14 December 2010	Finland	8–2	(Republic of Ireland) Republic of Ireland	Jyväskylä, Finland; Friendly

== 2011 ==
20 January 2011 Group F	Republic of Ireland	1–2	Andorra	National Basketball Arena; 2012 UEFA Futsal qualifier
20.00		Report

21 January 2011 Group F	Republic of Ireland	0–5	Norway	National Basketball Arena; 2012 UEFA Futsal qualifier
		Report	Klaussen 9'; Johnsen 16'; Sortevik 29'; Ravlo ?'; L. Jonvik ?'

23 January 2011 Group F	Republic of Ireland	0–3	Israel	National Basketball Arena; 2012 UEFA Futsal qualifier
20.00		Report

== 2012 ==
20 January 2011 2012 UEFA Futsal qualifier	Republic of Ireland	1–2	Andorra	National Basketball Arena
20.00		Report

21 January 2011 2012 UEFA Futsal qualifier	Republic of Ireland	0–5	Norway	National Basketball Arena
		Report	Klaussen 9'; Johnsen 16'; Sortevik 29'; Ravlo ?'; L. Jonvik ?'

23 January 2011 2012 UEFA Futsal qualifier	Republic of Ireland	0–3	Israel	National Basketball Arena
20.00		Report
