= Eden Futsal Club =

- Full name: English in Dublin; Sporting Fingal EID; EID Futsal; Eden College; Eden Futsal
- Founded: 2008
- Ground: IT Blanchardstown
- League: Emerald Futsal League
Home colours	Away colours	Third colours

Eden Futsal Club is an Irish futsal club based in Blanchardstown, Fingal. The club played under various names including English in Dublin, Sporting Fingal EID, EID Futsal and Eden College. In 2008 they were founder members of the Emerald Futsal League and between 2010 and 2014 they won the FAI Futsal Cup five times in a row. As a result, they also represented the Republic of Ireland in the UEFA Futsal Cup on five consecutive occasions between 2010–11 and 2014–15.

== History ==
=== Emerald Futsal League ===
In 2008 English in Dublin were founding members of the Emerald Futsal League. They were effectively the futsal team of an English language school of the same name based in Merrion Square. In 2009 they became affiliated with Sporting Fingal F.C. and began playing as Sporting Fingal EID. After the Sporting Fingal League of Ireland team disbanded, the futsal team continued to play as EID Futsal. Playing as EID Futsal they won their first Emerald Futsal League title in 2011, defeating Shamrock Rovers 3–1 in the final. In 2012 the club became affiliated to Eden College, another English language school. Playing as Eden Futsal Club, the club won a second league title in 2014, this time after defeating Transylvania 6–5 in the final.

=== FAI Futsal Cup ===
In 2010 Sporting Fingal EID won the FAI Futsal Cup after defeating Blue Magic 4–2 in the final. As EID Futsal they also won the 2011 and 2012 FAI Futsal Cups, again defeating Blue Magic in both finals. Playing as Eden College and then as then as Eden Futsal, the club won two further FAI Futsal Cups in 2013 and 2014. In the finals they defeated Shamrock Rovers and FCG Dublin Futsal respectively

=== UEFA Futsal Cup ===
As a result of winning the FAI Futsal Cup five times in a row between 2010 and 2014, Eden also represented the Republic of Ireland in the UEFA Futsal Cup on five consecutive occasions between 2010–11 and 2014–15. In 2010–11 and 2012–13 they won their preliminary groups and qualified for the main round. On the other three occasions, they finished as runners up in their preliminary groups. In 2014–15 they also acted as host of their group.

==== 2010–11 ====
In the 2010–11 UEFA Futsal Cup preliminary round Sporting Fingal EID travelled to Kaunas and after defeating the host team, FK Nautara Kaunas, and FC Kaghsi Yerevan (Armenia), 5–3 and 7–3 respectively, they won their group. In doing so they became the first team from the Republic of Ireland to progress beyond the preliminary round. However they failed to impress in the main round and lost all three of their games.

Preliminary round – Group A

Team	Pts	Pld	W	D	L	GF	GA
(Republic of Ireland) Sporting Fingal	6	2	2	0	0	12	6
(Armenia) Qakhsi Hrazdan	3	2	1	0	1	5	8
(Lithuania) FK Nautara Kaunas	0	2	0	0	2	4	7

Main Round – Group 3

Team	Pld	W	D	L	GF	GA	Pts
(Azerbaijan) Araz Naxçivan	3	3	0	0	17	7	9
(Romania) City'us Târgu Mureş	3	2	0	1	16	6	6
(Latvia) FK Nikars Riga	3	1	0	2	7	15	3
(Republic of Ireland) Sporting Fingal	3	0	0	3	7	19	0

==== 2011–12 ====
In the 2011–12 UEFA Futsal Cup EID Futsal finished as runners up in their group.

Preliminary round – Group B

Team	Pts	Pld	W	D	L	GF	GA
(Switzerland) Geneva Futsal	7	3	2	1	0	23	6
(Republic of Ireland) EID Futsal	7	3	2	1	0	19	14
(Lithuania) FK Nautara Kaunas	3	3	1	0	2	15	13
(Wales) The New Saints	0	3	0	0	3	11	35

==== 2012–13 ====
In the 2012–13 UEFA Futsal Cup EID Futsal won their preliminary group and qualified for the main round for second time. However once they again they finished fourth.

Preliminary round – Group C

Team	Pts	Pld	W	D	L	GF	GA	GD
(Republic of Ireland) EID Futsal	6	3	2	0	1	14	13	+1
(Austria) Allstars Wiener Neustadt	4	3	1	1	1	14	12	+2
(Turkey) TUFAD Ankara S.	4	3	1	1	1	11	11	0
(Switzerland) Futsal Minerva	3	3	1	0	2	18	21	-3

Main Round – Group 6

Team	Pts	Pld	W	D	L	GF	GA	GD
(Hungary) Győri ETO	7	3	2	1	0	14	7	+7
(Azerbaijan) Araz Naxçivan	4	3	1	1	1	9	13	-4
(Netherlands) Club Futsal Eindhoven	3	3	1	0	2	9	10	-1
(Republic of Ireland) EID Futsal	3	3	1	0	2	10	12	-2

==== 2013–14 ====
In the 2013–14 UEFA Futsal Cup Eden College finished as runners up in their preliminary group.

Preliminary round – Group F

Team	Pts	Pld	W	D	L	GF	GA	GD
(Belarus) MFK VitEn Vitebsk	9	3	3	0	0	20	6	+14
(Republic of Ireland) Eden College	4	3	1	1	1	7	7	0
(Sweden) Göteborg Futsal Club	4	3	1	1	1	10	12	-2
(Scotland) Perth Saltires	0	3	0	0	3	6	18	-12

==== 2014–15 ====
The 2014–15 UEFA Futsal Cup saw Eden Futsal host their preliminary group. The tournament was held at the National Basketball Arena between 25 August and 29 August 2014. Eden subsequently finished as runners up in the group.

Preliminary round – Group A

Team	Pts	Pld	W	D	L	GF	GA	GD
(Netherlands) Hovocubo	9	3	3	0	0	13	3	+10
(Republic of Ireland) Eden Futsal	6	3	2	0	1	15	7	+8
(Turkey) Istanbul Üniversitesi SK	3	3	1	0	2	11	8	+3
(Wales) Wrexham Futsal Club	0	3	0	0	3	4	25	–21

== Notable players ==
=== 2014 squad ===
Note: Flags indicate national team as defined under FIFA eligibility rules; some limited exceptions apply. Players may hold more than one non-FIFA nationality.

No.	Pos.	Nation	Player
—	GK	(Portugal) POR	Pedro Godinho
—	GK	(Croatia) CRO	Dalibor Surlin
—	GK	(Poland) POL	Marcin Fornal
—	DF	(Brazil) BRA	Arthur Barbosa
—	DF	(Portugal) POR	Joel Rocha
—	DF	(Brazil) BRA	Selassie Neto
—	DF	(Brazil) BRA	Edson Junior
—	DF	(Brazil) BRA	Rafael Rodrigues
—	DF	(Brazil) BRA	Rafael Souto

No.	Pos.	Nation	Player
—	DF	(Brazil) BRA	Hygo Silva
—	FW	(Poland) POL	Adam Kowalauk
—	FW	(Italy) ITA	Gabriel Gheno
—	FW	(Brazil) BRA	Leandro Maciel
—	FW	(Brazil) BRA	Matheus Xavier
—	FW	(Brazil) BRA	Rodrigo De Melo
—	FW	(Brazil) BRA	Ricardo Braga
—	FW	(Brazil) BRA	Helio Neto
—	FW	(Morocco) MAR	Badr Bouznig

Head Coach
(Brazil) Rodrigo de Melo

=== Republic of Ireland internationals ===
- (Republic of Ireland) Ian Carry
- (Republic of Ireland) Ian Byrne
- (Republic of Ireland) Brendan Dawson
- (Republic of Ireland) Mark Langtry
- (Republic of Ireland) Thomas Morgan
- (Republic of Ireland) John Perkins
- (Republic of Ireland) Ross Zambra

== Honours ==
- FAI Futsal Cup
  - Winners: 2010, 2011, 2012, 2013, 2014 : 5
- Emerald Futsal League
  - Winners: 2011, 2014: 2
  - Runners Up: 2013: 1
- UEFA Futsal Cup Preliminary Group
  - Winners: 2010–11, 2012–13: 2
  - Runners Up: 2011–12, 2013–14, 2014–15: 3
- PELE Sports Dublin Futsal Cup
  - Winners: 2011: 1
