= Shamrock Rovers F.C. (futsal) =

Former futsal club in Tallaght, Ireland

Shamrock Rovers
- Full name: Shamrock Rovers
- Founded: 2000
- Dissolved: 2013
- Ground: National Basketball Arena
- League: Emerald Futsal League; Eircom U21 Futsal League
- Website: http://www.shamrockrovers.ie
Home colours

Shamrock Rovers Futsal Club was an Irish futsal club based in Tallaght, South Dublin. It was the futsal team of Shamrock Rovers F.C. In 2007 they were the inaugural winners of the FAI Futsal Cup and they subsequently represented the Republic of Ireland in the 2007–08 UEFA Futsal Cup. They were the first team to represent the Republic of Ireland in the UEFA Futsal Cup. Between 2009 and 2011 they also played in three successive Emerald Futsal League title play-off finals, winning the competition in 2009 and 2010.

== History ==
=== Early years ===
Shamrock Rovers F.C. first formed a futsal team in 2000 in order to compete in a pilot league organised by the Leinster Senior League. The team was coached by Kevin Carroll and Mitch Whitty.

=== FAI Futsal Cup ===
In 2007 together with Bohemians, Bray Wanderers, Drogheda United, Dundalk, Monaghan United, St Patrick's Athletic and UCD, Shamrock Rovers played in the Eircom U21 Futsal League. This league featured futsal teams attached to clubs playing in the League of Ireland U21 Division and the winners were awarded the FAI Futsal Cup. The eight clubs first played in a league stage featuring a single round of games. The top four from this stage – UCD, Shamrock Rovers, Bohemians and Bray Wanderers – then qualified for a final four tournament played at the National Basketball Arena. In the final, with a team coached by Dave Campbell and featuring Ciarán Kilduff and Dane Massey, Shamrock Rovers defeated UCD 4–2. In 2013 Rovers played in a second FAI Futsal Cup final but this time lost 6–2 to Eden College.

=== UEFA Futsal Cup ===
After winning the 2007 FAI Futsal Cup, Shamrock Rovers qualified to represent the Republic of Ireland in the 2007–08 UEFA Futsal Cup. They became the first team to represent the Republic of Ireland in the UEFA Futsal Cup. For the preliminary round they travelled to Vienna and participated in a mini-tournament to decide who would qualify for the main round. Rovers finished third in the group.

Preliminary round – Group D

	Team	Pld	W	D	L	GF	GA	GD	Pts
1.	(Armenia) Politekhnik Yerevan	3	3	0	0	15	6	+11	9
2.	(Austria) Stella Rossa Wien	3	2	0	1	13	6	+7	6
3.	(Republic of Ireland) Shamrock Rovers	3	1	0	2	9	11	-2	3
4.	(Scotland) Fair City Santos	3	0	0	3	6	20	-14	0

12 August 2007	Politekhnik Yerevan	3–2	Shamrock Rovers
	Yedigaryan 7' 9'; Petrosyan 26'		Langtry 8'; Massey 26'

13 August 2007	Stella Rossa Wien	5–1	Shamrock Rovers
	Aigner 12' 38'; Lovakovic 23'; Darazs 36'; Bec 40'		Kilduff 36'

15 August 2007	Shamrock Rovers	6–3	Fair City Santos
	Langtry 4'; Massey 10'; Dawson 14' 35pen' Kilduff 20'; Vickery 39pen'		Hughes 21'; Jerabek 27'; Duigan 40'

=== Emerald Futsal League ===
Between 2009 and 2013 Shamrock Rovers played in the Emerald Futsal League. During this time the team was coached by Stephen Finn. In October 2009 Shamrock Rovers won the Emerald Futsal League title after a 7–4 win in the final against Bray/St Joseph's. Other members of the league this season included Sporting Fingal, St Patrick's Athletic, Alpha United, ISL Futsal and North County Dublin. In 2010 Rovers retained the title after defeating Dublin Santos in the play-off final. In 2011 they played in their third successive Emerald Futsal League play-off final but this time lost 3–1 to EID Futsal. After playing in their second FAI Futsal Cup final in 2013, Shamrock Rovers F.C. closed down the team. The remaining players and coaching staff merged with FC Guillermo Futsal and formed a new team, FCG Dublin Futsal. This team were Emerald Futsal League play-off finalists in 2014.

== Notable players ==
Republic of Ireland internationals

- (Republic of Ireland) Ian Byrne
- (Republic of Ireland) Brendan Dawson
- (Republic of Ireland) Jack Doyle
- (Republic of Ireland) Mark Langtry
- (Republic of Ireland) Alan Lynch
- (Republic of Ireland) Dane Massey
- (Republic of Ireland) Lloyd Massey
- (Republic of Ireland) Philip McDonagh
- (Republic of Ireland) Cian McDonald
- (Republic of Ireland) Paul McNally
- (Republic of Ireland) John Somers

Republic of Ireland U21 internationals

- (Republic of Ireland) Ciarán Kilduff
- (Republic of Ireland) Dane Massey
- (Republic of Ireland) John Perkins
- (Republic of Ireland) Ian Byrne

== Coaches ==
Seasons	
2000–	Kevin Carroll/Mitch Whitty
2007–2008	Dave Campbell
2009–2013	Stephen Finn

== Honours ==
- FAI Futsal Cup
  - Winners: 2007 : 1
  - Runners Up: 2013: 1
- Emerald Futsal League
  - Winners: 2009, 2010: 2
  - Runners Up: 2011: 1
