= National Basketball Arena =

Indoor sporting arena located in Ireland

- Tallaght Arena
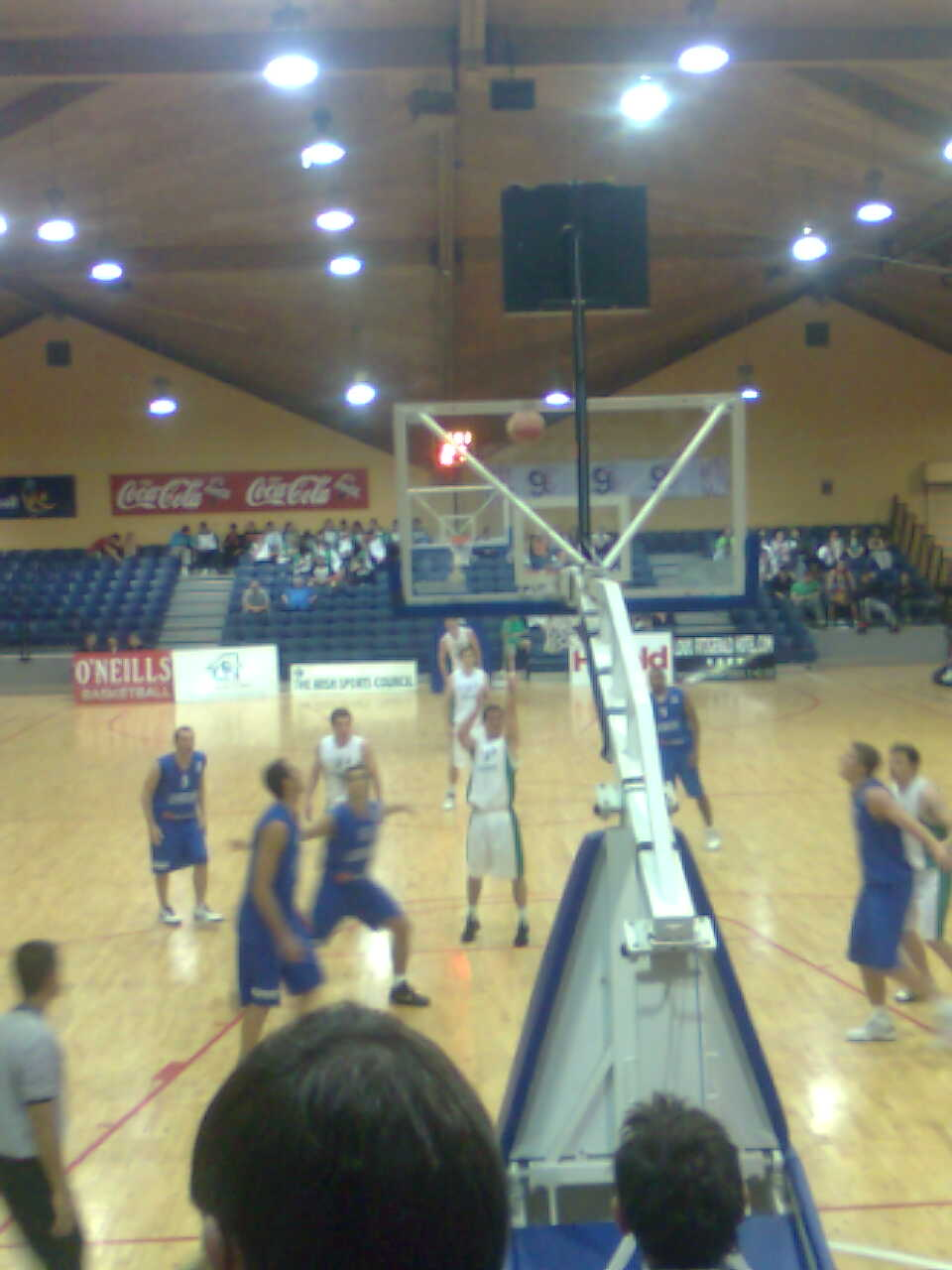
- Irish national team playing against Luxembourg in 2009

- Location within Dublin
- Location: Tymon Park; Tallaght; South Dublin
- Coordinates: 53°17′32″N 6°20′4″W
- Owner: Basketball Ireland
- Operator: Basketball Ireland
- Capacity: 2,500 (1993–2026); 3,300 (2026–)

Construction
- Opened: January 1993
- Expanded: 2025–2026
- Architects: Saniel Tully Ass (US); Kenney & Ass.
- Structural engineer: Dermot O'Keefe Associates

Tenants
- Ireland national basketball team (1993–present); Ireland women's national basketball team (1993–present); Hibernia Basketball (2015–2016); Republic of Ireland national futsal team (2009–2012); Shamrock Rovers (futsal) (2007–2013); Shamrock Rovers Hoops (1995–2010)

Website
- https://ireland.basketball/find-us

National Basketball Arena, also known as Tallaght Arena, is an indoor sporting arena located in Tymon Park, Tallaght, South Dublin, adjacent to the M50 motorway. The capacity of the arena is 2,500 people and it opened in January 1993. It is used mainly for basketball events, but has also hosted other indoor sports, most notably futsal, as well as exhibitions, concerts and cultural events.

== Basketball ==
The National Basketball Arena serves as the headquarters of Basketball Ireland. It serves as the home court of the Ireland national basketball team and the Ireland women's national basketball team and regularly hosts Super League games. It has previously served as the home court of Hibernia Basketball and Shamrock Rovers Hoops. The arena hosted the 1994 European Promotion Cup for Men and the 2022 Dublin Basketball Challenge, with teams from the MAAC and ASUN competing.

In December 2023, Basketball Ireland announced plans for a €35 million redevelopment of the National Basketball Arena to double its capacity to 3,300.

== Futsal ==
The National Basketball Arena has hosted finals of both the FAI Futsal Cup and the Emerald Futsal League. It has also served as the home court of both the Republic of Ireland national futsal team and Shamrock Rovers. The arena has also hosted international futsal tournaments. In February 2009 the Republic of Ireland played against Cyprus, England and Kazakhstan in a 2010 UEFA Futsal Championship preliminary group qualifying tournament. The Republic of Ireland acted as hosts and all six group games were played at the National Basketball Arena. The Republic lost to both Cyprus and Kazakhstan, either side of a 2–0 win against England. In January 2011 the Republic of Ireland played against Andorra, Norway and Israel in a UEFA Futsal Euro 2012 preliminary group qualifying tournament. Once again the Republic of Ireland acted as hosts and all six group games were again played at the National Basketball Arena. In August 2014 when Eden Futsal Club hosted their 2014–15 UEFA Futsal Cup preliminary group, all six games were played at the National Basketball Arena.

== Boxing ==
The arena has hosted many boxing fights, featuring, among others, Wayne McCullough, Eddie Hyland, Naseem Hamed, Oisin Fagan, Michael Carruth, Scott Dixon and Patrick Hyland.

== Other sports ==
The arena hosted an American Wrestling Rampage show in 2008 which featured wrestlers such as Rob Van Dam, Sabu, Chris Masters, Rene Dupree and Scotty 2 Hotty. It has also hosted wrestling events presented by Irish Whip Wrestling and Over the Top Wrestling.

The National Basketball Arena has also hosted karate, gymnastics, taekwondo, and MMA events.
