= FAI Futsal Cup =

- Organiser(s): Football Association of Ireland
- Founded: 2007
- Region: Republic of Ireland
- Current champions: Blue Magic
- Most championships: Blue Magic (8 wins); Blue Magic (11 finals)

The FAI Futsal Cup is a cup competition organized by the Football Association of Ireland for futsal teams based in the Republic of Ireland. The winners qualify to represent the Republic of Ireland in the UEFA Futsal Cup. The competition was introduced in 2007 and the inaugural winners were Shamrock Rovers. The 2007 tournament was referred to as the Eircom U21 Futsal League and the 2008 and 2009 tournaments were referred to as the Futsal League of Ireland or the FAI National Futsal League. Since 2010 it has generally been referred to as the Ireland Futsal Union Cup.

== History ==
=== Early tournaments ===
The FAI Futsal Cup was originally awarded to the winners of the Eircom U21 Futsal League, a tournament featuring futsal teams attached to clubs playing in the League of Ireland U21 Division. The competition was officially launched at Dublin City University on 13 February 2007 with a reception attended by, among others, Packie Bonner. Eights clubs from the U21 Division, including Bohemians, Bray Wanderers, Drogheda United, Dundalk, Monaghan United, Shamrock Rovers, St Patrick's Athletic and UCD entered the inaugural tournament. These eight clubs first played in a league stage featuring a single round of games. The top four from this stage – UCD, Shamrock Rovers, Bohemians and Bray Wanderers – then qualified for a final four tournament played at the National Basketball Arena. In the final, with a team coached by Dave Campbell and featuring Ciarán Kilduff and Dane Massey, Shamrock Rovers defeated UCD 4–2. St Patrick's Athletic won the second tournament in 2008 and Cork City, with a team featuring Kevin Long, were winners in 2009. Long was one of several future Republic of Ireland internationals who featured in the early tournaments. Others included David Meyler (Cork City), Séamus Coleman (Sligo Rovers) and James McClean (Derry City). Former Republic of Ireland international, Gary Kelly, played for Drogheda United in the 2008 tournament. Other players to feature included Gary McCabe and Jay O'Shea, both of whom played for Bray Wanderers.

=== Format ===
As the number of entrants increased the format of the tournament changed. Fourteen clubs entered the 2009 competition and clubs initially played in three divisions – a Leinster Division, a Munster Division and a North-West Division. In 2010 the tournament was expanded to include clubs from the Emerald Futsal League in addition to futsal teams associated with League of Ireland clubs. Junior clubs and representative teams of junior leagues were also invited to participate, resulting in a record entry of 32 teams. The 2010 format saw four preliminary qualifying tournaments – one per province – been staged throughout the country. The 2015 tournament featured eleven clubs.

=== Eden era ===
Playing under various names including, Sporting Fingal EID, EID Futsal and Eden College, Eden Futsal Club won the FAI Futsal Cup five times in a row between 2010 and 2014.

=== Blue Magic ===
After finishing as runners up in 2010, 2011 and 2012, Blue Magic won the FAI Futsal Cup for the first time in 2015 and then retained the cup in 2016.

== Finals ==
Season	Winner	Score	Runner-up	Venue
2007	Shamrock Rovers	4–2	UCD	National Basketball Arena
2008	St Patrick's Athletic	3–1 ^{(Note 1)}	Bohemians	National Basketball Arena
2009	Cork City	4–2 ^{(Note 1)}	St Patrick's Athletic	National Basketball Arena
2010	Sporting Fingal EID	4–2	Blue Magic	BRL Umbro Arena, Ballymun
2011	EID Futsal	3–2	Blue Magic	Gormanston College
2012	EID Futsal	7–4	Blue Magic	ALSAA Sports Complex
2013	Eden College	6–2	Shamrock Rovers	National Basketball Arena
2014	Eden	6–3	FCG Dublin Futsal	AIT International Arena
2015	Blue Magic	6–5	B&H United	National Basketball Arena
2016	Blue Magic	7–3	Transylvania	National Basketball Arena
2017	Transylvania	16-2	Puskas Hagi	National Indoor Arena
2018	Fut Samba	3-2	Blue Magic	National Indoor Arena
2019	Blue Magic	6-5	Transylvania	National Indoor Arena
2020	Blue Magic	8-0	Saints and Scholars	National Indoor Arena
2021	Blue Magic	N/A	COVID-19	National Indoor Arena
2022	Blue Magic	12-2	Pro Brazil	National Indoor Arena
2023	Blue Magic	8-4	Real Transylvania	National Indoor Arena
2024	Blue Magic	8-1	St. Ita's	National Indoor Arena
2025	Blue Magic	7-2	Pro Brazil	National Indoor Arena

Notes

- ^1 After extra time
