= Thomas Morgan (footballer) =

Irish footballer

Personal information
- Full name: Thomas Morgan
- Date of birth: 30 March 1977 (age 49)
- Place of birth: Dublin, Ireland
- Position: Midfielder

Youth career
- Belvedere

Senior career*
Years	Team	Apps	(Gls)
1994–1997	Blackburn Rovers	0	(0)
1997–2000	St Patrick's Athletic	32	(2)
2000–2001	Newry Town	22	(0)
2001–2003	Bray Wanderers	35	(3)
2003–2004	Shelbourne	?	(2)
2005	Dundalk	?	(1)
2006–2008	Kildare County	?	(?)
2009	Sporting Fingal (futsal)	?	(?)

International career
2008	Republic of Ireland (futsal)		
- * Club domestic league appearances and goals

Thomas Morgan (born 30 March 1977) is an Irish former footballer.

== Career ==
Morgan had made his first appearance in the green shirt for the under-15s - against Northern Ireland in Belfast, as captain under manager Joe McGrath and had also played at under-16 and under-18.

Thomas Morgan came to prominence during the 1997 FIFA World Youth Championships where he captained the Irish team which won the bronze medal. During those championships he lined up alongside the like of Damien Duff to face players like Juan Román Riquelme and Esteban Cambiasso of Argentina. At that time he was on the books of Blackburn Rovers and was highly regarded by the club having signed on his sixteenth birthday. There were offers to play with English lower league clubs but Morgan decided to return to Ireland and signed for St Patrick's Athletic where he won back to back league titles in '98 and '99.

Morgan moved to Newry Town F.C. in the Irish League making a scoring debut at Omagh Town on 26 August 2000.

He returned to the League of Ireland where he spent time with Bray Wanderers (39 total appearances), Shelbourne (where he won back to back league titles in '03 and '04) and Dundalk before joining Kildare County at the beginning of the 2006 season.

His first cousin is Wesley Hoolahan.
