= 2008 in Ireland =

- Centuries: 19th; 20th; 21st
- Decades: 1980s; 1990s; 2000s; 2010s; 2020s
- See also: 2008 in Northern Ireland; Other events of 2008; List of years in Ireland

Events from the year 2008 in Ireland.

== Incumbents ==
- President: Mary McAleese
- Taoiseach:
  - Bertie Ahern (FF) (until 7 May 2008)
  - Brian Cowen (FF) (from 7 May 2008)
- Tánaiste:
  - Brian Cowen (FF) (until 7 May 2008)
  - Mary Coughlan (FF) (from 7 May 2008)
- Minister for Finance:
  - Brian Cowen (FF) (until 7 May 2008)
  - Brian Lenihan (FF) (from 7 May 2008)
- Chief Justice: John L. Murray
- Dáil: 30th
- Seanad: 23rd

== Events ==
=== January ===
- 2 January – The Burlington Hotel in Dublin closed after 36 years in business with the loss of 400 jobs.
- 4 January – An unforecast blizzard hit the country, leading to the heaviest snowfall in Ireland since December 2000.
- 8 January – Clare O'Leary became the first Irish woman to reach the South Pole.
- 9 January – After days of heavy rainfall in the southwest, serious flooding occurred in Fermoy and Mallow with parts of Mallow under 1.3 metres of water.
- 13 January – Following months of protest, Aer Lingus completed its last Shannon to Heathrow flight.
- 16 January – Wayne O'Donoghue was released from prison after serving three years of a four-year jail term for the manslaughter of Robert Holohan (aged 11) in January 2005.
- 21 January – €4bn was wiped off the Irish Stock Exchange due to the effects of the 2008 financial crisis.
- 23 January – The brother of a Real IRA leader was one of two Irish citizens arrested in Lithuania on suspicion of buying firearms and explosives for the Real IRA.
- 25 January – The closure of the Jacob's biscuit plant in Tallaght, County Dublin, was announced, with the loss of 220 jobs by March 2009.
- 26 January – Martin Foley ("The Viper") was shot in Dublin possibly as part of a feud between criminal gangs. It was the fifth failed attempt on Foley's life.

=== February ===
- 1 February – The Taoiseach, Bertie Ahern, travelled to Ballymena, County Antrim to meet the Northern Ireland First Minister, Ian Paisley, and open a resort and spa.
- 4 February – Dublin-based gangland criminal, Paddy Doyle, was shot dead in Southern Spain.
- 6 February – Éamon Ó Cuív, Minister for Community, Rural and Gaeltacht Affairs, announced a €250,000 grant to allow Orange Lodges to employ a development officer.
- 13 February – Italian coach Giovanni Trapattoni was confirmed as the new manager of the Irish football team.
- 23 February – Two Polish men were attacked with screwdrivers by a gang of teenagers in Drimnagh in Dublin. Both died later from their injuries.
- 29 February – Ireland became the 22nd nation to recognise Kosovan independence.

=== March ===
- 5 March – A jury found Brian Kearney guilty of the murder of his wife, Siobhán Kearney, at their home in Goatstown, Dublin in February 2006.
- 12 March – Libertas lobby group launched a campaign called Facts, not politics which advocated a No vote in the Treaty of Lisbon referendum.
- 14 March – The Economic and Social Research Institute predicted that economic growth in Ireland for 2008 will be 1.6%, the lowest level since 1988. It was also forecast that no new jobs will be added to the Irish economy for the first time since 1991.
- 24 March – RTÉ last broadcast radio programmes on the medium wave.
- 26 March – Farmer Michael Hanrahan, 60, and his son Denis Hanrahan, 27, were found shot dead at their home in Moyvane, County Kerry.

=== April ===
- 2 April – Bertie Ahern announced that he would resign as Taoiseach on 6 May.
- 8 April – Brian Cowen was elected as the seventh leader of the Fianna Fáil party.
- 12 April – Patrick Hillery, sixth Irish President, former government minister, and European Commissioner, died aged 84.
- 15 April – The legal case of broadcaster Pat Kenny and his neighbour, Gerard Charlrton, involving the claiming of an area of land near their home, was settled in court. It was decided that Kenny would pay an undisclosed sum of money for the land called Gorse Hill.
- 17 April – Ciarán Cannon became the leader of the Progressive Democrats party.
- 21 April – It was revealed that four laptop computers belonging to Bank of Ireland and containing personal information of approximately 10,000 customers were stolen between June and October 2007.
- 30 April – Bertie Ahern became the sixth Irish leader to address both houses of the United States Congress.

=== May ===
- 6 May – As part of one of his last engagements as Taoiseach, Bertie Ahern opened a new visitors centre at the site of the Battle of the Boyne in County Meath alongside Northern Ireland First Minister Ian Paisley.
- 7 May – Dáil Éireann elected Fianna Fáil leader Brian Cowen as Taoiseach.
- 10 May – Sixteen-year-old Roman Vysochan, a Ukrainian national, was found stabbed to death in Corbally on the outskirts of Limerick.
- 11 May – A 51-year-old man was killed and another seriously injured in a small plane crash in Kilmovee, County Mayo.
- 14 May – An excavation was carried out in the Slieve Bloom Mountains for the remains of Fiona Pender, who was missing since 1996, following the discovery of a cross with her name printed on it.
- 20 May – The television puppet Dustin the Turkey failed to qualify for the Eurovision Song Contest 2008 after being knocked out at the first semi-finals stage.
- 24 May – Celebrations took place across Munster as the Munster rugby team beat Toulouse 16–13 in the 2007–08 Heineken Cup at the Millennium Stadium in Cardiff, Wales.
- 30 May – The international Convention on Cluster Munitions was adopted at the end of a ten-day diplomatic conference in Croke Park, Dublin.

=== June ===
- Treaty of Lisbon Referendum:
  - 12 June – Irish citizens voted on whether to amend the Irish Constitution in order to ratify the European Union-reforming Lisbon Treaty.
  - 13 June – The result of the Lisbon Treaty vote was 53% voting "No" and 47% voting "Yes" meaning that the proposed amendment to the Irish Constitution and ratification of the Lisbon Treaty were both rejected.
- 16 June – Minister for Foreign Affairs, Micheál Martin, met with European Union leaders to discuss the future of the Lisbon Treaty.
- 28 June – A syndicate of workers at a concrete products plant in County Carlow became the winners of Ireland's biggest ever national lottery jackpot of €18,963,441.
- 30 June – The law requiring learner drivers on a second provisional licence to be accompanied by a fully qualified driver came into effect.

=== July ===
- 1 July – New vehicle registration tax rates based on carbon dioxide emissions were introduced.
- 8 July – The Department of Finance announced a €440m spending cutback in the Government budget, including a €144m deduction from the Department of Health and Children.
- 11–13 July – The Oxegen 2008 music festival took place at Punchestown Racecourse in County Kildare.
- 21 July – French President Nicolas Sarkozy visited Ireland to discuss the future of the Lisbon Treaty with Taoiseach Brian Cowen.
- 28 July – The Ryanair airline revealed a loss in profit for the first time since becoming a public company in 1997.
- 31 July – Heavy rainfall brought flash floods to Newcastle West in County Limerick and Mallow, County Cork.

=== August ===
- 2 to 10 August – Jamboree 2008, an international scouting Jamboree, took place in Punchestown, County Dublin.
- 3 August – Ger McDonnell (37), the first Irishman to reach the summit of the K2 mountain in Pakistan, was presumed dead after being hit by falling ice upon descent.
- 9 August – Chloe Magee became the first Irish Olympian to win a badminton match at the 2008 Beijing Olympics.
- 9 August – Flash floods occurred in County Dublin and County Kildare due to record rainfalls of approximately 80 litres per square metre.
- 10 August – Golfer Pádraig Harrington won the US PGA Championship, his third major win.
- 16 August – A Dublin to Cork train derailed south of Portarlington, County Laois.
- 22 August – A bogslide displaced 30,000 people and caused massive ecological and infrastructural damage in County Kerry.

=== September ===
- Early September – The 68-metre Elysian building was completed in Cork as the tallest storeyed building in the Republic of Ireland.
- 3 September – Ireland's unemployment rate reached 6.1%, the highest since 1999.
- 7 September – Kilkenny beat Waterford 3–30 to 1–13 in the final of the All-Ireland Senior Hurling Championship 2008.
- 19 September – Three people suffered minor injuries following a helicopter crash in a school playground in Bettystown, County Meath.
- 21 September – The Tyrone football team beat Kerry 1–15 to 0–14 to be crowned All-Ireland Senior Football Championship 2008 winners.
- 25 September – It was announced that the Irish economy had officially entered recession in January 2008 for the first time since 1983.
- 30 September – The Government decided during the night to offer a €400 billion guarantee to, initially, six leading Irish banks to prevent their collapse due to the worldwide Great Recession.

=== October ===
- 2 October – For the first time in its history since 1922, Seanad Éireann (the Irish Senate) began debate of a bill after midnight, the Credit Institutions (Financial Support) Act 2008 which it passed at 8 am.
- 7 October – Amateur astronomer Dave McDonald in Celbridge, County Kildare discovered asteroid (281507) 2008 TM9, only the third minor planet found by observation from Ireland, the last (9 Metis) being found by Andrew Graham at Markree Observatory in County Sligo on 25 April 1848.
- 14 October – Minister for Finance Brian Lenihan unveiled Budget 2009, the toughest government budget in recent years and also the most controversial. He announced that the automatic entitlement of over-70s pensioners to a medical card, entitling them to free medical care, would be withdrawn, all workers would be exposed to a 1% income level, and an increase in college fees would come into effect.
- 21 October – Following country-wide outrage, Taoiseach Brian Cowen increased the higher income thresholds for the elderly that would allow 95% of those over 70 to retain their full medical cards.
- 22 October – Over 25,000 old age pensioners and angry students marched on Dáil Éireann to protest at their treatment in the government budget.
- 25 October – Two adults and two teenagers from Bristol, England were killed in a plane crash in the Wicklow Mountains.

=== November ===
- 6 November – €750 million worth of cocaine was seized off the Irish coast in Operation Seabight.
- 8 November – Rugby player Shane Geoghegan was shot dead outside his home in Limerick in a case of mistaken identity. The murder led to a nationwide appeal to the end of gangland killing in Ireland.

=== December ===
- 6 December – 2008 Irish pork crisis: All Irish pork products were recalled following an announcement that animal feed used since 1 September might contain between 80 and 200 more times dioxins than the recognised safety limit.
- 11 December – Irish pork was confirmed to be safe and began to return to the market.
- 15 December – Celine Cawley, founder and manager of the advertising agency Toytown Films and a former Bond girl (A View to a Kill), was found murdered at her home in Howth, Dublin.
- 20 December – Labour Party Teachta Dála Sean Sherlock called on Bishop of Cloyne, John Magee to resign after a report on child sexual abuse by clergy in his diocese found the Roman Catholic Church had not responded appropriately to abuse allegations.
- 31 December – Three teenagers in Nenagh, County Tipperary became the final Irish road traffic accident victims of 2008, a year which ended with the fewest traffic deaths since records began, according to Transport Minister Noel Dempsey.

=== Year long ===
- Scouting in Ireland celebrated its centenary. Events to celebrate were planned throughout the year with the National Jamboree and an exhibition in the National Museum as highlights.

== Arts and literature ==
- 9 September – Elaine Murphy's play Little Gem debuted in Dublin.
- 29 September – Sebastian Barry's novel The Secret Scripture was published and won the James Tait Black Memorial Prize in fiction, Book of the Year in the 2008 Costa Book Awards and Irish Novel in the 2009 Irish Book Awards.
- 1 December – Raidió Teilifís Éireann's digital radio revolution began with the official launch of five new digital radio and broadband services which had been on trial for twenty months. They were RTÉ Choice, a sister speech station to RTÉ Radio 1; easy listening and ambient service RTÉ Chill; RTÉ Junior, which was aimed at two to ten-year-olds; the dance-based RTÉ Pulse; and RTÉ 2XM, a sister station to the rock and indie components of RTÉ 2fm.
- Sorj Chalandon's novel My Traitor was published.
- Marian Keyes' novel This Charming Man was published and won the Popular Fiction award in the 2009 Irish Book Awards.

== Sport ==
=== Association football ===
- Internationals

6 February – Ireland 0–1 Brazil
24 May – Ireland 1–1 Serbia

- World Cup 2010 Qualifiers

6 September – Georgia 1–2 Ireland
10 September – Montenegro 0–0 Ireland
15 October – Ireland 1–0 Cyprus

- Setanta Sports Cup
  - Summary
  - Winner: Cork City
- League of Ireland
  - Summary
  - Div.Premier winner: Bohemians
  - Div. 1 winner: Dundalk
  - Div.A winner: Mervue United
- FAI Cup
  - Summary (Final)
  - Winner: Bohemians

=== Athletics ===
- 26 January-27 January – Irish Indoor Athletics Championships, Odyssey Arena, Belfast.

=== Gaelic games ===
- Football

All-Ireland Senior Football Championship 2008 (Winners – Tyrone)
National Football League 2008 (Winners – Derry)

- Hurling

All-Ireland Senior Hurling Championship 2008 (Winners – Kilkenny)
National Hurling League 2008 (Winners – Tipperary)

=== Golf ===
- Irish Open – Adare Manor, May 2008 (winner – Richard Finch)

=== Rugby league ===
2008 Rugby League World Cup
Ireland reach the final 6 knockout stage

=== Rugby union ===
2008 Six Nations Championship
2 February – Ireland 16–11 Italy
9 February – France 26–21 Ireland
23 February – Ireland 34–13 Scotland
8 March – Ireland 12–16 Wales
15 March – England 33–0 Ireland

Ireland come fourth, their lowest finishing position since 1999

2007–08 Heineken Cup
Munster champions – Toulouse 13–16 Munster

=== Olympics ===
Beijing Olympics
Ireland at the 2008 Summer Olympics – 3 medals
Ireland at the 2008 Summer Paralympics – 5 medals

== Deaths ==
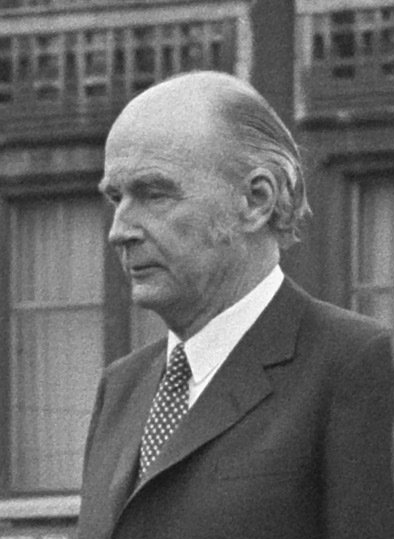
Patrick Hillery died on 12 April

- 1 January
  - Philip Hogarty, 19, chair of the Irish Chess Union, killed by a Garda patrol car.
  - Peter Caffrey, actor (born 1949).
- 3 January – John O'Donohue, poet and philosopher (born 1956).
- 26 January – Raymond Daniels, Wicklow Gaelic footballer (born 1979).
- 27 January – Dan Kavanagh, 87, Kerry Gaelic footballer.
- 13 February – Paul Goldin, hypnotist.
- 20 February – Bríd Mahon, 85, folklorist (born 1922).
- 23 February – Jim English, Wexford hurler (born 1932).
- 29 February – Chris Cary, 61, broadcaster and founder of Radio Nova. Died in on a working trip in Tenerife from a stroke.
- 5 March – Jimmy Faulkner, guitarist with Christy Moore and other groups.
- 6 March – Garry McMahon, 70, Kerry Gaelic footballer.
- 3 April – Brendan O'Brien, 67, musician (The Dixies), probable heart attack.
- 4 April – Pat Stakelum, Tipperary hurler (born 1927).
- 12 April – Patrick Hillery, 84, former President of Ireland.
- 13 April – Michael Mills, 80, former journalist and Ireland's first government ombudsman (1984–1994).
- 28 April – John Barron, 74, former Waterford hurler.
- 2 May – Martin Codd, former Wexford hurler (born 1929).
- 9 May – Nuala O'Faolain, 68, journalist and writer.
- 21 May – Brian Keenan, 66, Provisional Irish Republican Army member.
- 31 May – Terry Keane, 68, former gossip columnist.
- 28 June
  - Christopher "Crip" McWilliams, 44, member of the INLA, convicted murderer, cancer.
  - 28 June – Paddy Canny, 89, fiddle player.
- 9 July – Séamus Brennan, 60, Fianna Fáil TD and former government minister.
- 22 July – Paudie O'Donoghue, 64, former Kerry Gaelic footballer.
- 2 August – Ger McDonnell, 37, mountaineer, first Irishman to reach summit of K2, climbing accident.
- 3 August – Con O'Shea, former Kerry Gaelic footballer.
- 9 August – Colm Condon, 87, lawyer, Attorney General (1965–1973).
- 13 August – Nollaig Ó Gadhra, 64, Irish language activist, journalist and historian, co-founder of Teilifís na Gaeilge.

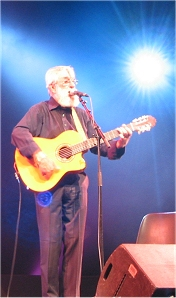
Ronnie Drew died on 16 August

- 16 August – Ronnie Drew, 73, singer, founding member of The Dubliners, after long illness.
- 28 August – Larry Fanning, 86, former Waterford hurler.
- 15 September – Ciaran Duffy, 42, managing director of Namibia Breweries Limited, cancer.
- 21 September – Paul Tansey, 59, economics editor of The Irish Times.
- 24 September – Claude Wilton, 89, Northern Irish politician, solicitor and civil rights campaigner
- 26 September – Bernadette Greevy, 68, mezzo-soprano.
- 11 October – Willie John Ring, 91, Cork hurler.
- 16 October – Greg Fives, 59, Waterford Gaelic football manager.

== See also ==
- 2008 in Irish television
