= Ciarán Kilduff =

Irish footballer (born 1988)

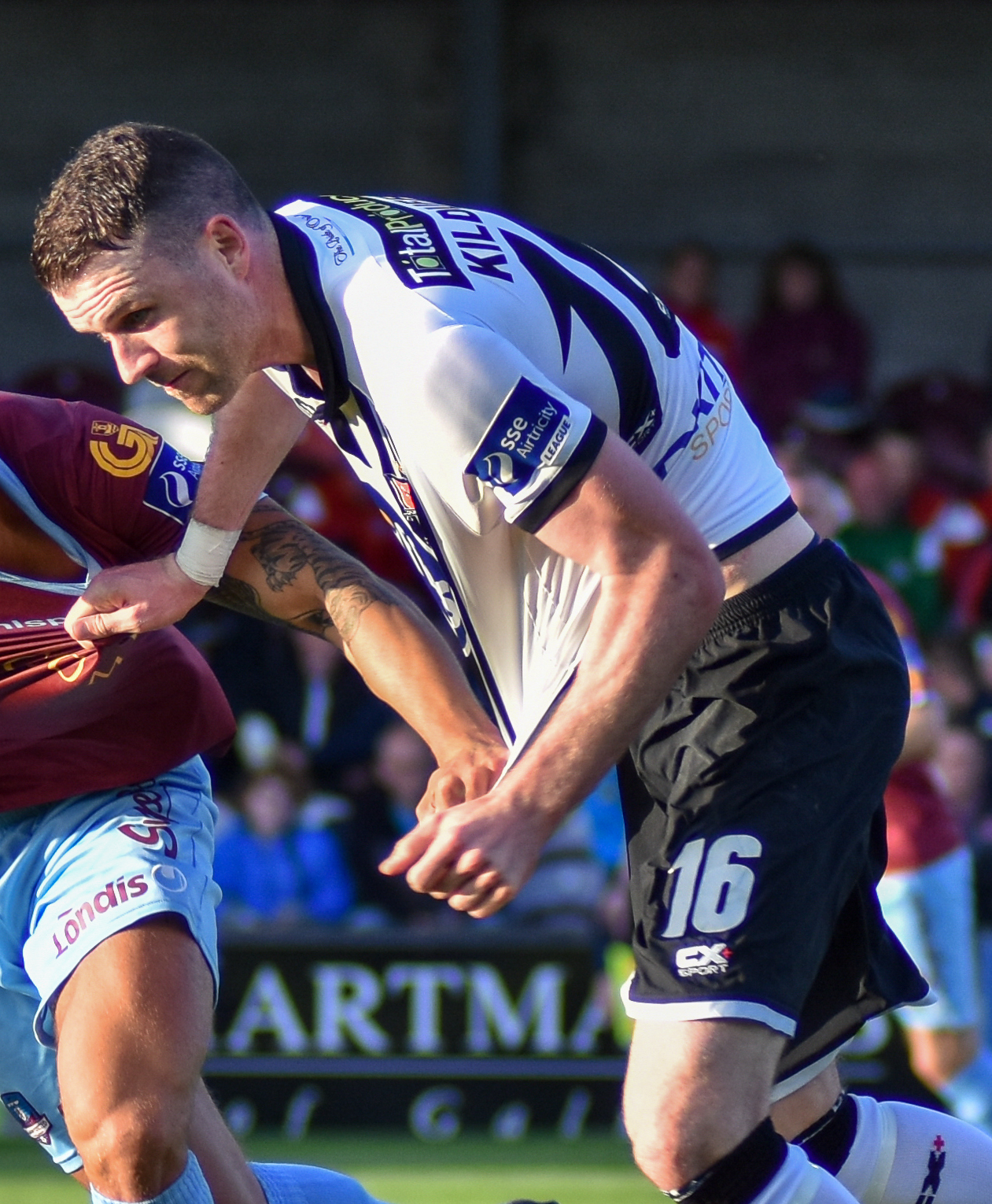
- Kilduff in 2016

Personal information
- Date of birth: 29 September 1988 (age 38)
- Place of birth: Kilcock, Ireland
- Position: Forward

Team information
- Current team: Dundalk (manager)

Youth career
- Clane Boys
- Kilcock Celtic
- Maynooth Town
- Shamrock Rovers

Senior career*
Years	Team	Apps	(Gls)
2007–2008	Shamrock Rovers	4	(0)
2008	→ Kildare County (loan)	35	(8)
2009–2010	UCD	51	(23)
2011–2014	Shamrock Rovers	82	(17)
2013	→ Cork City (loan)	14	(11)
2014	Shamrock Rovers B	1	(0)
2015	St Patrick's Athletic	13	(3)
2015–2017	Dundalk	50	(17)
2017–2018	Jacksonville Armada	12	(4)
2019–2020	Shelbourne	42	(15)

Managerial career
- 2023–2024: Athlone Town Ladies
- 2024–: Dundalk
- * Club domestic league appearances and goals

Ciarán Kilduff (born 29 September 1988) is an Irish football manager and former professional player, who is the manager of League of Ireland Premier Division club Dundalk. He has played for seven clubs in the League of Ireland throughout his career and appeared 16 times in European competition, playing in the UEFA Europa League group stages in two separate seasons. The first occasion was with Shamrock Rovers when they became the first Irish side to reach the group stage of the Europa League in 2011, and he was also part of the Dundalk team that qualified for the Europa League group stages after becoming the first Irish club to reach the play-off round of the Champions League in 2016.

== Early life ==
Kilduff was born in Kilcock, in 1988. Kilduff played youth football in the Kildare and District Schoolboys League for Clane Boys and Kilcock Celtic before moving to Maynooth Town in the North Dublin Schoolboys League. From Maynooth Town, he signed for Shamrock Rovers at under 16 level and progressed through to their under 21 team.

== Playing career ==
=== Shamrock Rovers ===
Kilduff was highly rated at Shamrock Rovers as a youth player and after a prolific season at under 21 level, where he scored over 20 goals, Kilduff made the breakthrough to the first team. He made his debut against Derry City in the Brandywell in May 2007. He went on to make a further three appearances in the same season.

As well as playing for the Shamrock Rovers first team, Kilduff was a member of the futsal team that won the 2007 FAI Futsal Cup side and later appeared for the club in the 2007–08 UEFA Futsal Cup. His debut in this tournament took place in August 2007 when Rovers faced Politekhnik Yerevan. He made 3 appearances in the competition in total and scored 2 goals. Kilduff also travelled to Portugal with the Republic of Ireland national under 21 futsal team where they took on sides from Portuguese clubs S.L. Benfica and Sporting CP. He also competed in the Dallas Cup.

Kilduff joined First Division side Kildare County on loan from Shamrock Rovers in 2008, following the path of Shamrock Rovers teammate Pádraig Amond who spent the first half of the previous season on loan at Kildare. Kilduff scored 8 league goals in 35 appearances and was voted the club's Player of the Year as well as finishing as their top scorer. In addition to this, Kilduff scored three goals in the 2008 FAI Cup, coming by way of a perfect hat-trick against Fanad United.

=== UCD ===
In 2009, Kilduff again moved from Shamrock Rovers to a First Division side, this time to UCD on a permanent basis. He scored 16 goals in 31 appearances, finishing as UCD's top scorer and helping them to lift the First Division title and achieve promotion to the Premier Division. Kilduff followed this up with 15 goals in 35 Premier Division appearances the following season.

=== Return to Shamrock Rovers ===
In January 2011, Kilduff returned to Shamrock Rovers under manager Michael O'Neill. He found league starts difficult to come by with 19 of his 27 league appearances coming from the bench. Despite this he scored 6 league goals in the season. In August 2011, Kilduff played an important role when coming on as a substitute against Partizan Belgrade in the Europa League play-off round victory. His parried shot led to a winning penalty for his team as Shamrock Rovers became the first Irish side to reach the group stages of either of the top two European competitions. He went on to appear as a substitute in five of the group games of the Europa League campaign.

In August 2012, Kilduff signed a new deal to keep him contracted at Shamrock Rovers until the end of the 2014 season and in May 2013, he won his second Setanta Sports Cup.

On 2 July 2013, it was announced that Kilduff would be joining Cork City on loan for the remainder of the season. He scored on his debut, a 3–1 win over Sligo Rovers at Turners Cross on 5 July 2013, and went on to score eleven goals in 14 league appearances, including a club record four in one game against Shelbourne, as the club finished sixth in the Premier Division. On the back of this form he was awarded the Airtricity/Soccer Writers Association of Ireland Player of the Month for October 2013.

With his loan deal complete, Kilduff returned to Shamrock Rovers at the end of 2013. He was involved in the team a lot more during the 2014 season, playing in 29 league games for Rovers and scoring six goals.

=== St Patrick's Athletic ===
Following the expiry of his contract at Shamrock Rovers, Kilduff signed a two-year deal for city rivals, St Patrick's Athletic on 11 November 2014. He made his debut for the club in a 7–0 win against Tolka Rovers in the Leinster Senior Cup on 9 February 2015 at Richmond Park, coming off the bench in the 68th minute to replace Christy Fagan and scoring two goals . He went on to make thirteen league appearances for the Saints, scoring three goals in wins over Galway United and Bohemians, and in a draw against Drogheda United, however by mid-season Kilduff had become third-choice striker behind Christy Fagan and Jamie McGrath. Liam Buckley agreed to sell him, under the condition that he could not play against St. Patrick's Athletic as the title race heated up.

=== Dundalk ===
On 27 July 2015 it was announced that Kilduff had signed for League of Ireland champions Dundalk for an undisclosed fee. Stephen Kenny had long been an admirer of Kilduff saying he "has a very good attitude and is a very willing player. He gets all types of goals and that's what I like. I see him more of a French striker, tall, athletic and scores goals, one on one goals through the middle with his pace." He scored twice on his debut for Dundalk against Bray. He proved himself to be an instrumental squad player in Dundalk's title winning year. He revelled in the turn around of being in the wilderness to being in the league winning team.

In 2016, however, he suffered a major setback when he fractured his vertebrae in an accidental collision with St Patrick's Athletic goalkeeper Brendan Clarke. He spent 10 days wearing a back brace that left him housebound and unable to move to the extent that he wasn't even allowed to have a shower. He expected to spend the season on the sidelines but with the help of the Dundalk medical staff he returned after only six weeks to play against St. Patrick's Athletic. He was rested for the following game which allowed David McMillan to kick off a goal-scoring streak and cement his place as first-choice striker again. Kilduff had hoped to play against Legia Warsaw in the Champions League play-off round but missed out due to a serious knee complaint. He did, however, travel to the Netherlands to play against second seeds AZ Alkmaar in their opening Europa League group stage match, and after coming off the bench in the 84th minute he went on to score a headed goal in the 89th minute. This goal ensured a point for Dundalk's group stage campaign, the first point an Irish team has ever won in the group stages of European competition. Reflecting back on what the goal meant for him and the League he said: "I've had a tough year myself, and this little league probably gets looked down on a bit, but it's a league with passionate supporters and passionate players. It's not just for myself or the team tonight, it's for the League of Ireland. Away from football, I've had a difficult injury-stricken season and I can't describe what a relief and what a great feeling that was for me tonight". He emphasised the team's ambition to get out of the group rather than merely accruing money and was reluctant to be drawn on how the money would be spent. His achievement of scoring in such a high-profile match against the backdrop of his recent recovery from serious injury saw him named the Irish Independent Sports Star of the Week on 22 September 2016. He followed this up by scoring the winning goal on his 28th birthday against Maccabi Tel Aviv in the second Europa League group match. Having come on as a substitute in the 64th minute, he latched on to Daryl Horgan's 72nd-minute cross to tap home the winner against Maccabi - a goal that is worth €360,000 in UEFA prize money. Kilduff was rewarded for his display by being named in UEFA's Europa League team of the week on 30 September 2016.

Besides his exploits in the Europa League he was also instrumental in Dundalk's road to the 2016 FAI Cup Final. He scored goals that knocked out Shelbourne and UCD on the way to the semi-final. He then scored in both semi-final games against Derry City.

=== Jacksonville Armada ===
On 31 July 2017, Kilduff signed with Jacksonville Armada of the North American Soccer League.

=== Shelbourne ===
On 5 January 2019, Kilduff signed with Dublin club Shelbourne of the League of Ireland First Division.

== Managerial career ==
=== Athlone Town Ladies ===
On 27 June 2023, Kilduff was named as manager of Athlone Town Ladies. On 19 November 2023, he led the side to the FAI Women's Cup after beating Shelbourne on penalties in the final after a 2–2 draw. On 5 October 2024, Kilduff led the side to the 2024 League of Ireland Women's Premier Division title. On 20 October 2024, his side were defeated 6–1 by Shelbourne in the FAI Women's Cup Final, with Kilduff announcing he was stepping down as manager of the club after the game.

=== Dundalk ===
On 6 November 2024, Kilduff was named manager of League of Ireland First Division club Dundalk following their recent relegation. He led the club to the 2025 League of Ireland First Division title to earn promotion for the club back to the top flight, as well as winning the 2024–25 Leinster Senior Cup, but just days later on 30 October 2025, he had reportedly informed the club that he would be resigning as manager amid uncertainty at ownership level. The following day however, the club's majority and minority shareholders announced that they were working together to agree on a budget for Kilduff to strengthen his squad ahead of their return to the League of Ireland Premier Division. On 3 November 2025, he signed a new two-year-contract with the club.

== Career statistics ==
Appearances and goals by club, season and competition
Club	Season	League			National cup		League cup		Continental		Other		Total	
Club	Season	Division	Apps	Goals	Apps	Goals	Apps	Goals	Apps	Goals	Apps	Goals	Apps	Goals
Shamrock Rovers	2007	LOI Premier Division	4	0	0	0	0	0	—		—		4	0
Kildare County (loan)	2008	LOI First Division	38	8	2	3	0	0	—		—		40	11
UCD	2009	LOI First Division	15	14	2	2	1	0	—		—		18	16
UCD	2010	LOI Premier Division	35	15	2	0	1	0	—		2 (Note: Appearances in Leinster Senior Cup)	1	40	16
UCD	Total		50	29	4	2	2	0	0	0	2	1	58	32
Shamrock Rovers	2011	LOI Premier Division	27	6	4	1	1	0	9 (Note: Two appearances in UEFA Champions League; seven appearances in UEFA Europa League)	0	4 (Note: Three appearances, two goals in Setanta Sports Cup; one appearance in Leinster Senior Cup)	2	45	9
Shamrock Rovers	2012	LOI Premier Division	10	3	2	0	2	2	1 (Note: Appearance in UEFA Champions League)	0	0	0	15	5
Shamrock Rovers	2013	LOI Premier Division	16	2	1	0	1	1	—		6 (Note: Five appearances, three goals in Setanta Sports Cup; one appearance, one goal in Leinster Senior Cup)	4	24	7
Shamrock Rovers	2014	LOI Premier Division	29	6	4	1	4	3	—		3 (Note: Two appearances in Setanta Sports Cup; one appearance, one goal in Leinster Senior Cup)	1	40	11
Shamrock Rovers	Total		82	17	11	2	8	6	10	0	13	7	124	31
Cork City (loan)	2013	LOI Premier Division	14	11	—		—		—		—		14	11
Shamrock Rovers B (loan)	2014	LOI First Division	1	0	—		—		—		—		1	0
St Patrick's Athletic	2015	LOI Premier Division	13	3	—		1	0	2 (Note: Appearance in UEFA Europa League)	0	2 (Note: One appearance in President of Ireland's Cup; one appearance, one goals in Leinster Senior Cup)	2	16	5
Dundalk	2015	LOI Premier Division	12	4	4	1	—		—		—		16	5
Dundalk	2016	LOI Premier Division	20	7	5	4	1	0	11 (Note: Five appearances in UEFA Champions League; six appearances, two goals in UEFA Europa League)	2	1 (Note: Appearance in President of Ireland's Cup)	0	38	13
Dundalk	2017	LOI Premier Division	18	6	—		2	1	2	0	3 (Note: One appearance in President of Ireland's Cup; two appearances, six goals in Leinster Senior Cup)	6	25	13
Dundalk	Total		50	17	9	5	3	1	13	2	4	6	79	31
Jacksonville Armada	2017	North American Soccer League	12	4	2	1	—		—		—		14	5
Shelbourne	2019	LOI First Division	25	13	1	1	1	0	—		0	0	27	14
Shelbourne	2020	LOI Premier Division	17	2	2	2	—		—		1 (Note: Appearance in the League of Ireland relegation play-off)	0	20	4
Shelbourne	Total		42	15	3	3	1	0	0	0	1	0	47	18
Career total			306	115	31	16	15	8	23	2	22	16	411	156

== Managerial statistics ==
As of match played on 30 October 2026

Team	From	To	Record							
Team	From	To	G	W	D	L	F	A	Gd	Win %
(Republic of Ireland) Athlone Town Ladies	27 June 2023	6 November 2024	36	25	6	5	72	33	+39	69.44
(Republic of Ireland) Dundalk	6 November 2024	Present	87	43	23	31	169	108	+61	49.43
Total			123	68	29	36	241	141	+100	55.28

== Honours ==
=== As a player ===
Dundalk

- League of Ireland Premier Division (2): 2015, 2016

Shamrock Rovers

- League of Ireland Premier Division (1): 2011
- Setanta Sports Cup (2): 2011, 2013
- Leinster Senior Cup (1): 2012
- FAI Futsal Cup (1): 2007

Shelbourne

- League of Ireland First Division (1): 2019

UCD

- League of Ireland First Division (1): 2009

=== As a manager ===
Athlone Town Ladies

- League of Ireland Women's Premier Division (1): 2024
- FAI Women's Cup (1): 2023

Dundalk

- League of Ireland First Division (1): 2025
- Leinster Senior Cup (1): 2024–25
