= Republic of Ireland national futsal team =

Republic of Ireland
- Nickname(s): The Boys in Green
- Association: Football Association of Ireland; FEF Ireland Futsal Union
- Confederation: UEFA; FEF
- Head coach: Derek O'Neill
- Asst coach: Stephen Finn; Gleudson Junior Da Silva
- Home stadium: National Basketball Arena
- FIFA code: IRL
- FIFA ranking: 109
Home colours	Away colours

First international
- Republic of Ireland 4–1 Belgium (Rome, Italy; 16 July 1983)

Biggest win
- Republic of Ireland 7–2 England (Rome, Italy; 18 July 1983)

Biggest defeat
- Republic of Ireland 2–8 Finland (Jyväskylä, Finland; 14 December 2010)

FIFA World Cup
- Appearances: 0

UEFA Futsal Championship
- Appearances: 0

The Republic of Ireland national futsal team has represented the Republic of Ireland in the UEFA Futsal Championship. The Republic of Ireland has, to date, never qualified for the final stages of a major tournament. It has, however, taken part in several invitational tournaments, such as the 2008 Four Nations Futsal Cup. It is organised by the Football Association of Ireland.

== History ==
=== Early years ===
The Republic of Ireland national futsal team have been active since at least 1983. In July 1983, in Rome, they competed in a six team nations tournament. After defeating Belgium and losing to Czechoslovakia in the group stage, the Republic of Ireland defeated England 7–2 in a third/fourth place play-off. The other participants included Scotland and the eventual winners, Italy. In June 2001 they played a series of friendlies against Scotland and in February 2002 they hosted the Masita Cup tournament at St Columba's College, Dublin. Other participants in this tournament included Scotland, Northern Ireland and Tranmere Victoria, a club side that represented England. In October 2002 they also competed in the British Isles Nations Futsal Cup in Chester. The other participants in this competition included Tranmere Victoria, Scotland, Northern Ireland and Gibraltar. During this latter tournament the team was managed by Derek O'Neill, the FAI's futsal co-ordinator, and coached by Stephen Finn.

=== Revival ===
In 2007 the national team was revived, initially playing as an U21 team and selecting players from the Eircom U21 Futsal League. In December 2007 a Republic of Ireland U21 squad featuring Dane Massey, Gary McCabe and Ciarán Kilduff travelled to Portugal and played two friendlies against Benfica and Sporting Lisbon. In April 2008 the Republic of Ireland U21s also competed in the UEFA Futsal Under-21 Championship, travelling to Andorra la Vella to compete in a qualifying tournament against Andorra, the Netherlands and Azerbaijan. The squad again included Dane Massey. In preparation for the tournament the team played a friendly against an FC Barcelona B team, defeating them 2–0. In the tournament itself, the Republic of Ireland defeated Azerbaijan 4–3 and finished third.

In December 2008 the senior team was revived with two friendlies against Hungary. The squad included Thomas Morgan, Gary McCabe and Dane Massey. In the first game, which was screened live on Hungarian television, the Republic lost 4–1. Later in the same month, together with Lithuania, Libya and England, the Republic of Ireland also competed in the 2008 Four Nations Futsal Cup. The Republic, with a squad that included Dane Massey and Thomas Morgan, held England to a 3–3 draw.

=== UEFA Futsal Championship ===
The Republic of Ireland has competed in the qualifying stages of the UEFA Futsal Championship twice during the 2010s. In February 2009 with a squad that included Thomas Morgan, Gary McCabe and Dane Massey, the Republic of Ireland played against Cyprus, England and Kazakhstan in a 2010 UEFA Futsal Championship preliminary group qualifying tournament. The Republic of Ireland also acted as hosts and all six group games were played at the National Basketball Arena. The Republic lost to both Cyprus and Kazakhstan, either side of a 2–0 win against England. The Republic's scorers against England were Lloyd Massey, the brother of Dane, and Philip McDonagh. In January 2011 the Republic of Ireland played against Andorra, Norway and Israel in a UEFA Futsal Euro 2012 preliminary group qualifying tournament. This tournament saw the Massey brothers, Dane and Lloyd, take part together in a third UEFA Futsal qualifying tournament. Once again the Republic of Ireland acted as hosts and all six group games were again played at the National Basketball Arena. On this occasion the Republic of Ireland lost all three of their games.

=== DiaEuro Futsal ===
In recent times, the Republic of Ireland have been represented by the DiaEuro futsal squad; the national team for players with diabetes. The team was founded by Cathal Fleming in 2018 and have gone on to represent the nation at the 2019 DiaEuro futsal championships in Kyiv.

Record

UEFA Futsal Championship
Year	Round	Pld	W	D	L	GS	GA
1996	did not enter	-	-	-	-	-	-
1999	did not enter	-	-	-	-	-	-
2001	did not enter	-	-	-	-	-	-
2003	did not enter	-	-	-	-	-	-
2005	did not enter	-	-	-	-	-	-
2007	did not enter	-	-	-	-	-	-
2010	Preliminary round	3	1	0	2	2	7
2012	Preliminary round	3	0	0	3	1	10
2014	did not enter	-	-	-	-	-	-
2016	did not enter	-	-	-	-	-	-
2018	did not enter	-	-	-	-	-	-
2022	did not enter	-	-	-	-	-	-
2026	did not enter	-	-	-	-	-	-
Total	0/13	-	-	-	-	-	-

== Last qualifying campaign ==
=== UEFA Futsal Euro 2012 ===
Group F – Final table

Team	Pld	W	D	L	GF	GA	GD	Pts
Norway	3	3	0	0	19	6	13	9
Andorra	3	2	0	1	9	9	0	6
Israel	3	1	0	2	7	11	−4	3
Republic of Ireland	3	0	0	3	1	10	−9	0

Matches

20 January 2011 2012 UEFA Futsal qualifier	Republic of Ireland	1–2	Andorra	National Basketball Arena
20.00		Report

21 January 2011 2012 UEFA Futsal qualifier	Republic of Ireland	0–5	Norway	National Basketball Arena
		Report	Klaussen 9'; Johnsen 16'; Sortevik 29'; Ravlo (?); L. Jonvik (?)

23 January 2011 2012 UEFA Futsal qualifier	Republic of Ireland	0–3	Israel	National Basketball Arena
20.00		Report

== Notable players ==
=== 2011 squad ===
The squad selected for the UEFA Futsal Euro 2012 qualifying tournament in January 2011

No.	Pos.	Player	Date of birth (age)	Caps	Club
1	GK	John Somers			Shamrock Rovers
2	DF	Mark Langtry			Sporting Fingal/UCD
3	DF	Ian Byrne			Shamrock Rovers
4	DF	Philip McDonagh			Shamrock Rovers/Drumcondra
5	DF	Ross Zambra			Sporting Fingal/Wayside Celtic
6	MF	Dane Massey	7 April 1988 (age 38)		Bray Wanderers
7	MF	Lloyd Massey			Blue Magic Futsal
8	MF	Alan McCabe			AUL Futsal/Sheriff Y.C.
9	FW	Alan Lynch			Shamrock Rovers
10	FW	Jack Doyle			Shamrock Rovers
11	GK	Ian Carry			Sporting Fingal
12	FW	Tony Kane			AUL Futsal/Sheriff Y.C.
13	FW	Cian McDonald			Shamrock Rovers
14	FW	Brendan Dawson			Shamrock Rovers

=== League of Ireland Premier Division players ===
- (Republic of Ireland) Dane Massey
- (Republic of Ireland) Gary McCabe
- (Republic of Ireland) Thomas Morgan
