= Sport Against Racism Ireland =

Sport Against Racism Ireland (SARI)
- Founded: 1997
- Location: 135 Capel Street, Dublin 1, Ireland
- Region served: Ireland
- Website: www.sari.ie

Sport Against Racism Ireland (SARI) is an anti-racism not for profit organisation founded in Dublin in July 1997 ‘as a direct response to the growth of racist attacks from a small but vocal section of people in Ireland.’

SARI organise various events, projects, programmes and campaigns in order to ‘support and promote social inclusion and positive integration through sport’.

== Background ==
SARI was founded in 1997 during the European Year against Racism. Co-founders Ken McCue, Frank Buckley, and Perry Ogden recognised growing racism and xenophobia throughout Ireland and chose the medium of sport to facilitate integration among the growing diverse population in Ireland. In the years since its establishment, SARI has held numerous events, accumulated many international partners, and achieved charity status. The patrons of SARI are John Rocha and Benjamin Zephaniah. As well as the chairman, Perry Ogden, the board consists of Ali Curran, Phil Flynn, Brian Kerr and Eamon O'Shea.

== Activities and Events ==
SARI is involved in many activities and events, in addition to ongoing projects such as Living Together Through Football, COUNT US IN, and STEMS.

=== Africa Week Athletics ===
Africa Week Athletics is an annual event held at Morton Stadium that draws together people from an immigrant background through the medium of athletics. Past guests include 2008 800m Olympic gold medal winner Wilfred Bungei and two time Olympic gold medalist Kip Keino.

=== Beach Cricket with UNITAS ===
Organised in partnership with the UNITAS ISAC (Integration through Sports, Arts and Culture), the Beach Cricket Festival takes place in Meath East Coast to promote social integration through cricket and raise funds for the DAA Staff Charity of the Year.

=== Football For Hope ===
SARI was chosen as a representative of the Republic of Ireland and Northern Ireland at the Football For Hope festival in South Africa in 2010. Taking place in the final week of the 2010 World Cup in Alexandra, Johannesburg - 32 organisations were chosen from around the world by FIFA and streetfootballworld to take part in the Festival aimed at promoting development through football.

=== Soccerfest ===
Soccerfest began in 1997 and has since been established as the largest intercultural 7-a-side soccer tournament in Ireland. 46 teams consisting of different gender, background, and culture competed in the 2013 edition, sponsored by Tesco Mobile in Phoenix Park. Of these 46 teams, countries including Afghanistan, Bangladesh, China, Ireland, Saudi Arabia and South Africa were represented.

Past guests of Soccerfest’s annual All-Star soccer match include Irish rugby legend Malcolm O'Kelly, boxers Eric Donovan, Kenny Egan, Martin Keenan, John Joe Nevin, Darren O'Neill and Martin Rogan, former Dublin GAA stars Dessie Farrell and Senan Connell, Kildare’s All-Ireland Camogie winner Ciara Tallon, Irish Soccer internationals Áine O'Gorman, Louise Quinn, Stephanie Roche and Mary Waldron, former Nigerian internationals James Igwilo and Zuby Ufoh, snooker legend Ken Doherty, former Shamrock Rovers players Rohan Ricketts and Ryan Thompson, Joseph N'Do of Sligo Rovers, Republic of Ireland Under 21 manager Noel King, presenter Eoin McDevitt and actor Gary Cooke.

=== Soccernites ===
Run by Head Coach and former professional football player, Zuby Ufoh, Soccernites is a year round, bi-weekly soccer training programme offered to inner city boys and girls in North Dublin. In 2014, Soccernites expanded to include a Young Leaders Programme.

=== Stick With Diversity ===
Hosted at Civil Service Cricket Club in Phoenix Park, Stick With Diversity introduces people of different ethnic backgrounds to a variety of 'stick' sports, such as Baseball, Camogie, Cricket, Croquet, Hockey, Hurling, Rounders, Shinty, Softball and Table Tennis.

=== United Through Sport DVD ===
The United Through Sport DVD was ‘a major awareness campaign and education support promoting the powerful potential for positive integration through sport.’

The DVD features contributions from Sonia O'Sullivan, Shay Given, Mickey Harte, Mícheál Ó Muircheartaigh, Jan Dinsdale, Harpal Singh Purewal, Karen Cromie, Martin Rogan, Karen Bingh, Gugu Banda, Glenn Ferguson, Trevor Ringland, Trent Johnston, Jessica Kurten, Ken Doherty, Jimmy Magee, Chloe Magee, Bernard Dunne, Sean Og O hAilpin, Tracy Piggott, Fiona Scally, Jason Sherlock, Jerry Flannery, Brian Kerr, John Joe Joyce.

=== World Refugee Day Fair Play Football Cup ===
SARI works with the United Nations High Commissioner for Refugees to organise the annual Fair Play Football Cup. The tournament attracts over 100 players from various refugee and community groups.

In 2013, World Refugee Day Fair Play Football Cup had a team entirely from a Direct Provision Centre in Ireland; such centres are temporary facilities which house asylum seekers in Ireland.

== Partners/See Also ==
European Network Against Racism

Football Against Racism in Europe

Football Association of Ireland
