= Futsal European Federation =

Governing Body in European Futsal

- Sport: Futsal
- Category: Sports federation
- Abbreviation: FEF
- Founded: 2017
- Affiliation: Asociación Mundial de Futsal
- Affiliation date: 2017
- Regional affiliation: Europe
- Headquarters: (Italy) Milan
- President: (Italy) Luca Alfieri
- Secretary: (Spain) Alex Astorgas

Official website
- futsaleuropeanfederation.com

The Futsal European Federation (FEF) is the futsal governing body for both fully and non-independent states or regions in Europe. It was founded in 2017 to replace UEFS. FEF organizes men's and women's tournaments for both national/regional and club teams in Europe.

== Members ==
European Union of Futsal
	Member	Website
Belarus	Belarus Futsal Federation (BFF)	futsalbelarus.by
Catalonia	Catalan Federation of Futsal (FCFS)	futsal.cat
France	French Futsal Association (AFF)	affs.fr
(United Kingdom) Great Britain	Great Britain Futsal Federation (GBFF)	GBFF
Italy	Federazione Italiana Football Sala (FIFS)	fifs.it
Monaco	Monégasque Football Federation (FMF)	FMF-Futsal
Morocco	Maroc Futsal Federation	
Northern Cyprus	Cyprus Turkish Football Association (CTFA)	ktff.org
Russia	All Regional Federation Futsal of Russia	futsal-mff.ru
Switzerland	La Federazione Svizzera Football Sala (FSFS)	fsfsala.altervista.org
(Republic of Ireland) Ireland	Ireland Futsal Union (IFU)	irelandfutsalunion.wordpress.co
