= Dane Massey =

Irish footballer (born 1988)

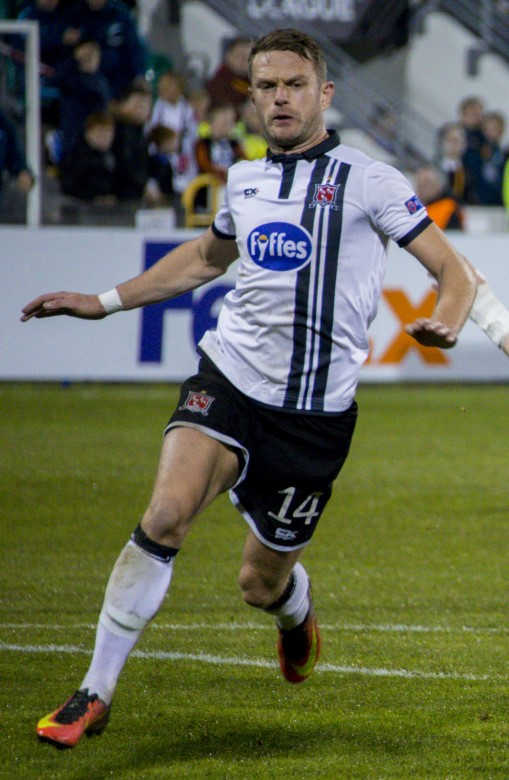
- Dane Massey playing against Zenit Saint Petersburg in the 2016–17 Europa League

Personal information
- Full name: Dane Massey
- Date of birth: 17 April 1988 (age 38)
- Place of birth: Dublin, Ireland
- Position: Defender

Youth career
- Cherry Orchard

Senior career*
Years	Team	Apps	(Gls)
2008–2012	Bray Wanderers	117	(5)
2013–2020	Dundalk	211	(19)
2021–2022	Drogheda United	63	(4)
2023	Bray Wanderers	30	(4)

International career
2008	Republic of Ireland U21 (futsal)	3	(2)
2008–2016	Republic of Ireland (futsal)	5	(0)
- * Club domestic league appearances and goals

Dane Massey (born 17 April 1988) is an Irish former professional footballer who played as a defender for League of Ireland Premier Division clubs Bray Wanderers, Dundalk and Drogheda United, as well as for the Republic of Ireland national futsal team. Massey has made all 14 of his appearances in European competition for Dundalk and was part of their team that became the first Irish side to reach the play-off round of the UEFA Champions League in August 2016.

== Early life ==
Massey grew up in the Knocklyon suburb of Dublin and played youth football for Cherry Orchard in the same team as Simon Madden, Adam Rooney and Stephen Gleeson. His first visit to watch a League of Ireland side play was with his father in 2004 when Shelbourne drew 0−0 with Deportivo La Coruna in a Champions League 3rd qualifying round tie at Lansdowne Road.

== Professional career ==
=== Bray Wanderers ===
Massey came through the underage ranks at Bray Wanderers and made the breakthrough to the senior team in 2008. He made his professional debut in a League of Ireland Cup tie against Shamrock Rovers in May 2008 and went on to play five times that season for the club. In 2009, Massey made 34 appearances and scored his first senior goal against Shamrock Rovers, before going on to score three more goals that season.

Massey played 31 times for Bray in the 2010 season and was also named the Supporters' Club Player of the Month for April of that year. He appeared 26 times and scored one goal for Bray in 2011, and added another 27 league appearances in 2012.

=== Dundalk ===
Massey left Bray in December 2012 and, despite interest from Bohemians, he signed for Stephen Kenny at Dundalk. He cited Kenny's pledge to utilise him in an attacking full-back role, as opposed to the more defensive game he played at Bray, as being one of the deciding factors for the move. Massey made his debut for the club against Shamrock Rovers on the opening night of the 2013 season. He went on to score four times in 30 league appearances as Dundalk finished second in the league to champions St Patrick's Athletic.

Massey stayed with Dundalk for the 2014 season and was part of a defence that kept sixteen clean sheets in the league. He also formed an effective partnership down the left-hand side with Daryl Horgan. In July 2014, Massey made his European debut in the Europa League against Jeunesse Esch. He was named the League of Ireland Premier Division Player of the Month for September 2014 after his brace of goals helped Dundalk to beat Shamrock Rovers in the League Cup final that month. Those two goals came a week after scoring a free kick in a 5−0 rout of Derry City in the league. He played in all 33 league games, scoring two further goals in wins over Sligo Rovers and UCD, as Dundalk won the Premier Division title. Massey then signed a new contract with the club to extend his stay until the end of 2015.

==== 2015 season ====
In 2015, Massey went on to make 32 league appearances for the club, scoring four goals in the process, as Dundalk once more won the Premier Division title. In April 2015, his form led to calls in the media for his inclusion in the Republic of Ireland national team and manager Martin O'Neill indicated that he would be following Massey's performances closely. He also appeared in both Champions League Second Qualifying Round matches, as Dundalk were eliminated by BATE Borisov. In the first leg in the Borisov Arena, Massey was involved in an altercation with Vitali Rodionov after BATE's second goal, with video footage later revealing Massey had been headbutted. Despite this, UEFA imposed no sanction following a public apology from Rodionov. In November 2015, Massey appeared in the FAI Cup Final, in which Dundalk beat Cork City 1–0 after extra-time. He was named in the PFAI Premier Division Team of the Year at the end of the season.

==== 2016 season ====
In 2016, Massey played every minute of all 6 of Dundalk's UEFA Champions League qualifier games as they became the first ever Irish side to reach the play-off round. This included providing an assist for David McMillan to score his second goal in a 3−0 victory over BATE Borisov in the second Qualifying Round. Massey received significant exposure due to this achievement, appearing on RTÉ's Saturday Night with Miriam in August 2016.

==== 2017 season ====
2017 was a less climatic season for Dundalk. They beat rivals Shamrock Rovers 3–0 in the EA Sports Cup to retain their crown, but lost out on both the FAI Cup and the league title to Cork City. Massey scored in a 3–1 away loss to Derry City, and a 2–0 home win against Galway United. He started all 5 of Dundalk's European matches, although their campaign ended prematurely when they were beaten twice over 2 legs by Rosenborg in the UEFA Champions League qualifiers. He made 37 appearances in all competitions

==== 2018 season ====
Massey was named as club captain ahead of the 2018 season, and wore the armband for all of Dundalk's opening 11 league matches. The Lilywhites went all the way in every domestic competition. Massey scored an equaliser in the 119th minute of their EA Sports Cup second round fixture against Saint Pat's. The game ended 4-4 and Dundalk won the subsequent competition. His goal in a 5–2 thrashing of rivals Shamrock Rovers at Tallaght Stadium also proved crucial when Dundalk sealed the league title once again. They beat Cork City in the FAI Cup final, but were denied the chance of a domestic treble when they were defeated by Cobh Ramblers in their League Cup semi final. Massey was awarded for his efforts when the Stephen Kenny offered him a new 2-year contract, which he signed on 28 November 2018.

==== 2019 season ====
At the start of the 2019 season, assistant manager Vinny Perth took over the club as Stephen Kenny took the position of Ireland U21 manager. Massey scored Dundalk's first goal of his tenure when he netted a header in the President's Cup against Cork City in February. During the season, he opened the scoring away to Sligo Rovers and at home to Saint Patrick's Athletic; Dundalk won both matches. Dundalk won a league and cup double for the second year running, but were beaten on penalties by Shamrock Rovers in the FAI Cup final. Massey played a total of 34 games in all competitions

==== 2020 season ====
Dane Massey's final season at Dundalk was hindered by injury. He struggled to find his place in the team under new manager Filippo Giavagnoli. He started the season well, scoring Dundalk's first goal of the campaign with a 79th-minute winner against Derry City at Oriel Park. His only other goal came against Cobh Ramblers in the FAI Cup. Unfortunately for him, he managed just 9 appearances all season. His injury meant he missed Dundalk's entire Europa League group campaign, and the FAI Cup final which they won. Massey announced on 7 January 2021 that his 8-year spell at Dundalk had come to an end and his contract would not be renewed. He described his time there as "the ride of a lifetime".

=== Drogheda United ===
==== 2021 season ====
On 8 January 2021, just 24 hours after leaving Dundalk, Dane Massey signed a one-year contract with their local rivals, newly promoted Drogheda United. His new manager, Tim Clancy, had been a former teammate of his at Bray Wanderers. He kept a clean sheet on his competitive debut; a 1–0 win over Waterford on 19 March. His first goals in his new colours came in the reverse fixture, a 7–0 thrashing of Waterford's U19 side who had been fielded due to a COVID-19 outbreak in the senior squad, on 8 May. Just a week later, on 14 May, he scored a beautiful free kick against Saint Patrick's Athletic, and continued his form on 21 May when he scored for the third week in a row, bagging a last minute winner away to Finn Harps. Massey's impressive performances led to him playing 33 games for the club in 2021

==== 2022 season ====
On 9 December 2022, Massey signed a new contract with Drogheda United for a further year. He was also named club captain by new manager Kevin Doherty. He spent most of the campaign playing as a centre back, but an injury to left back Evan Weir in late September saw Massey deployed in his former fullback position for the final stretch of the season. He finished the campaign with 33 appearances in all competitions.

=== Return to Bray Wanderers ===
On 6 December 2022, Massey re-signed for Bray Wanderers a decade after leaving the club. On 8 February 2023, Massey was named as vice-captain to Dave Webster for the upcoming season. Massey made his second debut for Bray, captaining the side to a 1–0 win away to Treaty United on the opening day of the 2023 First Division season. He made a total of 30 league appearances in his second spell with the club, scoring 4 goals.

=== Retirement & Post Playing Career ===
On 15 January 2024, he announced his retirement from football, aged 35. In August 2025, he returned to his former side Dundalk as a first-team coach, under manager Ciarán Kilduff, who played alongside Massey at the club during his time there.

== Futsal ==
Massey also had a career in Futsal before focusing completely on association football. He credits the game with having a huge influence on his skills as a football player and improving his confidence on the ball. Massey made three appearances in the 2007–08 UEFA Futsal Cup for Shamrock Rovers, scoring two goals. His debut in this tournament took place in August 2007 when Rovers faced Politekhnik Yerevan. In 2008, Massey went on to represent the Republic of Ireland U21 Futsal team on 3 occasions, scoring 2 goals. He also made 5 appearances for the Republic of Ireland national team in the UEFA Futsal Championship qualifying rounds. His brother, Lloyd, also played Futsal for Shamrock Rovers and the Republic of Ireland national team. They played alongside each other for the national team at 3 UEFA Futsal tournaments.

== Personal life ==
Massey worked as an electrician in the early part of his career to supplement his income alongside playing part-time football. In 2014, Massey balanced training and matchday commitments at Dundalk with working a few mornings a week as an electrician in the Jervis Shopping Centre in Dublin, however he gave this up at the beginning of 2015 to go full-time.

== Honours ==
Dundalk

- League of Ireland Premier Division: 2014, 2015, 2016, 2018, 2019
- FAI Cup: 2015, 2018, 2020
- League of Ireland Cup: 2014
- President's Cup: 2015, 2019

Individual

- PFAI Premier Division Team of the Year: 2015
- League of Ireland Premier Division Player of the Month: September 2014
- Templeogue United FC Goal Of The Week Winner November 10th 2026
