= 2008 Ireland floods =

Natural disaster in Ireland

Meteorological history
- Duration: 1 – 19 August

Overall effects
- Fatalities: 1
- Damage: 100 houses and 18 dogs
- Areas affected: Ireland; United Kingdom (Northern Ireland)

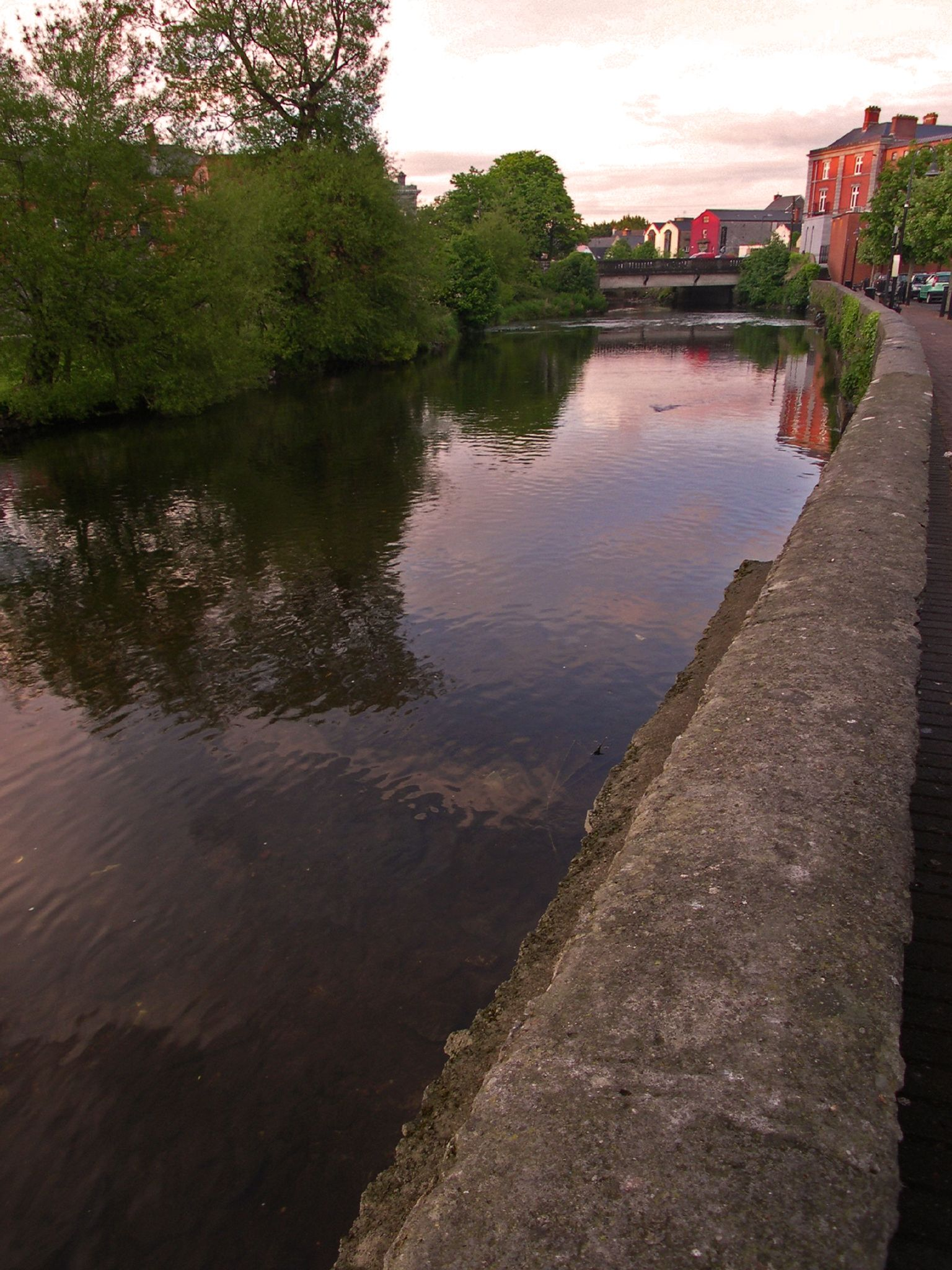
One victim was pulled from the River Fergus in Ennis, County Clare.

The 2008 Irish flash floods were a series of flash floods that occurred across the island of Ireland in August 2008. The floods and related weather conditions primarily affected the following counties; Limerick, Cork, Dublin, Antrim, Carlow, Galway, Laois, Louth, Meath, Kildare, Kilkenny, Tipperary, Offaly, Sligo and Donegal. Parts of Ireland's large urban centres, including Dublin and Belfast, were submerged, whilst Carlow town has experienced some of the worst flooding in the country. One person died; 31-year-old dad-of-one Przemyslaw Jablonski. He went missing in the River Fergus, in Ennis, and was found 6 days later (on 18 August) in the same river. He was pronounced dead at the scene.

== Conditions before the floods ==
Rainfall in Cork for the month of July 2008 was the heaviest recorded since 1975. The combined total for June and July was more than twice the normal level of rainfall expected for that time period. Around the country the weather was wetter than normal for July with exceptional rainfall in County Limerick in the last 24 hours of July giving rise to this figure. Met Éireann described July as "a dull month generally". The highest average temperature recorded in July was 15.7 degrees (Shannon Airport); the same location also enjoyed the warmest day of the month at 25.2 degrees on 24 July. The lowest air temperature since the early 1970s was recorded at Mullingar during July – a figure of 3.6 degrees was recorded on the 5th. The greatest level of sunshine was in the east of the country – Dublin Airport recorded 156 hours of sunshine – whilst the lowest level of rainfall was recorded at Belmullet – 54 millimetres fell during July.

== Timeline of events ==
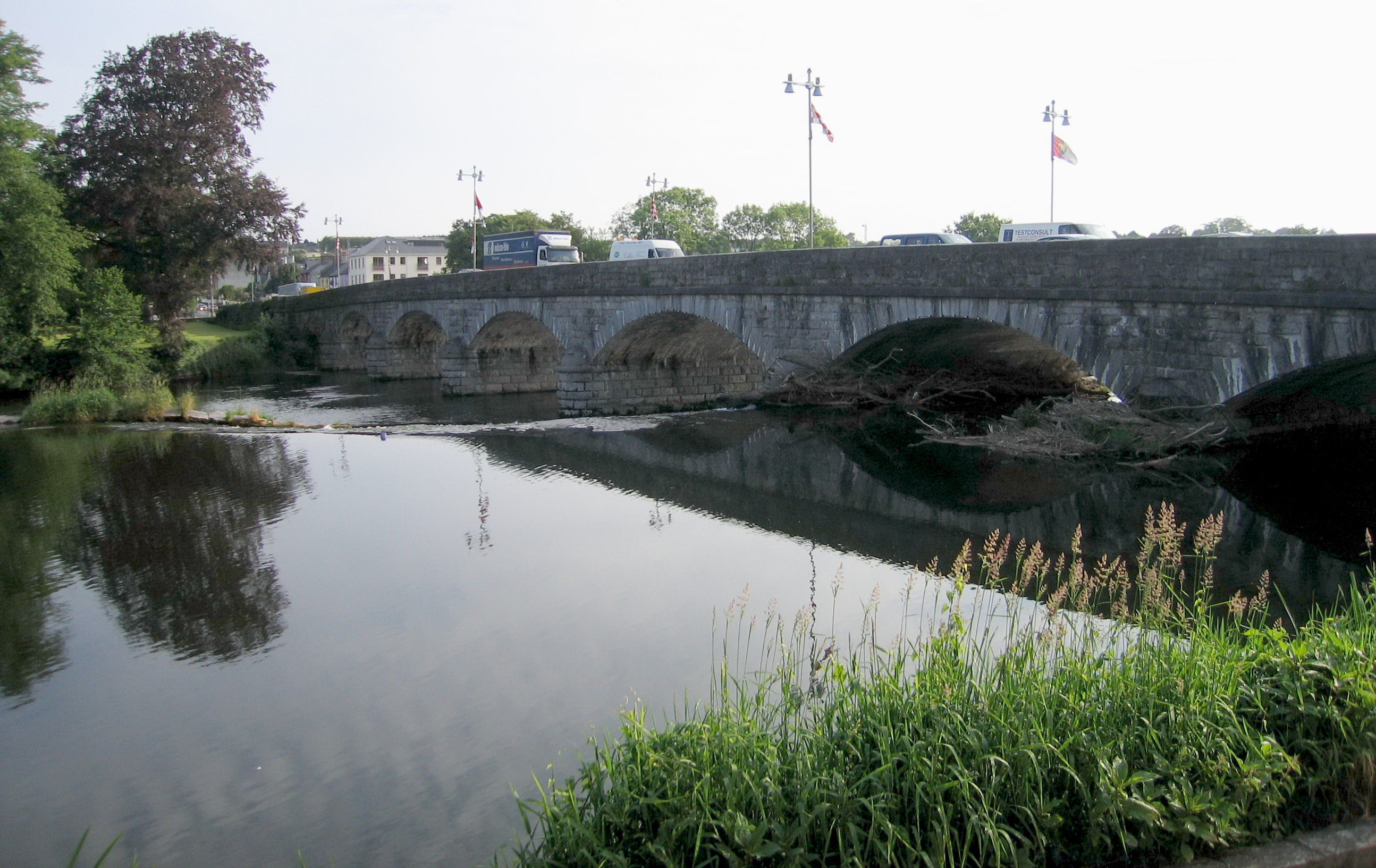
The River Blackwater burst its banks early on.

=== 1 August ===
County Limerick and County Cork were the first areas to be affected. On the night of 31 July/1 August, the River Blackwater in Cork burst its banks, causing severe flooding between Banteer and Mallow. Cork County Council issued a flood warning for Mallow on the morning of the 1st whilst cork council distributed sandbags. Bridge Street in Mallow was closed for a time but later reopened for motorist use. The Town Park Road in Mallow was closed for a longer period. Flood relief works had been ongoing in Mallow for six months but were not expected to finish for another 18 months. Further downstream, floodwaters reached Fermoy at around 10 pm.

In Limerick, it took several hours before electricity was restored to 3,000 homes in Newcastle West, where a major clear-up operation was underway after the River Arra burst its banks earlier in the morning. Up to 20 homes were badly affected by "freak" flash flooding overnight, with residents having to be rescued from their houses. There were few injuries; although an elderly woman was airlifted from her home and immediately diagnosed with hypothermia. Met Éireann said that the average rainfall for the last week of July was about 26mm – three times that amount dropped between 7 pm and midnighton 31 July in Newcastle West. At one rainfall station in the area, a measurement of 90.1mm was recorded in that time. Around 100mm of rain would be expected in one month. The rainfall was said to be "tropical-like in intensity". Limerick County Council issued a public drinking water notice residents of Newcastle West to boil their water before use. The areas affected by the boil notice included Newcastle West, Coolcappagh and Rathcahill and the Ballyine, Dually, Reens Kilscannell, Old Mill Road, Killoughteen and Killeline Group Water Supply Schemes.

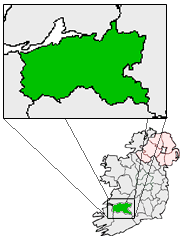
Residents in County Limerick were airlifted from their homes.

=== 2 August ===
The River Deel threatened to flood in Askeaton, County Limerick. Localised flooding occurred earlier in the day in the town. The Newcastle West Business Association called on the government to help those worst affected by the flash floods of the previous day. Spokesman Pat O'Donovan stated that many businesses were uninsured or under-insured and needed financial assistance. A huge cleanup operation continued in parts of Limerick and Cork. It was estimated that millions of euro worth of damage was caused. Met Éireann claimed that the area around Newcastle West experienced the equivalent of four weeks rain in five hours.

=== 9 August ===
The record for a single 24-hour period of rain in August was almost broken in Dublin. 56mm of rain fell on Dublin Airport in 24 hours. The record (60mm) was set in August 1986, in the aftermath of Hurricane Charley. Celbridge was flooded and nearby roads were impassable. Flooding was reported between Naas and Blessington. A river burst its banks along the Ballyroan to Portlaoise road at Cashel Cross in County Laois. Only one lane of the road was open to traffic at the time. The road between Portlaoise and Timahoe was badly flooded whilst the Stradbally Village to Athy road was impassable. Other roads closed included the N3 (inbound and outbound at Blanchardstown Shopping Centre), the M1 (inbound and outbound after the Port Tunnel), the M50 (blocked at Ballymun northbound) with diversions in place. Dart services were suspended between the Malahide and Howth junctions whilst there was also disruption to Northern Commuter and Belfast rail services. Garda diversions were put in place and long delays were to be had. Dublin Airport authorities asked passengers to give plenty of time to reach the airport and, if possible, to check their route before they leave. A football match between Shamrock Rovers and Sunderland, due to be played at Tolka Park at 7.30pm that evening, was cancelled due to the flooding.

In Dublin, it was reported that one vehicle was swept down a road in a torrent of flood water. "The combination of monsoon-like rain and a high-tide" prompted a spokesperson for Dublin Fire Brigade to report that crews spent most of the night rescuing people from houses and cars. He claimed that, between 4 pm and midnight, 800 calls were taken with 600 of these flood-related, going on to say: "We’ve never had anything like that. We wouldn’t generally get that many calls on Halloween.” Hundreds of Armagh Gaelic football fans, attending the All-Ireland quarter-final at Croke Park, were stranded by torrential rain when they left the stadium to discover their cars surrounded by water. The rain prompted GAA officials in Croke Park to turn on the floodlights for the second half of the All-Ireland quarter final between Kerry and Galway in what was to be the first ever floodlight championship game in Croke park, the game was described by many as the greatest game of pure vintage football played in Croke Park in the 2000s (decade) despite the worst rain in Irish history.

=== 10 August ===
A clean-up operation was underway in Dublin and Kildare following the previous day's flash flooding. Gardaí said flood water had subsided in most parts except for some areas in north county Dublin. The N3 near Blanchardstown was re-opened. On the M50 there was still severe flooding on both the northbound and southbound lanes. The M1 at Whitehall was re-opened on both sides following flood-related closures. According to Met Éireann, in the 24-hour period from midnight on 8 August until midnight on 9 August, 76.2mm of rain was recorded at Dublin Airport, a new record for the month of August. The previous record, 73mm, was recorded in August 1986.

Kildare County Council reported bad flooding in Celbridge. Eight houses in the Vanessa Close Estate were flooded with water of approximately 60 cm after the Toni River, a tributary of the River Liffey, overflowed. The Clane to Celbridge Road and Ardrass Road from Straffan to Celbridge were closed due to flooding. Flooded pumps caused sewage to flow into the streets of Celbridge, damaging some premises on the Main Street. 4,000 Scouts at Jamboree 2008 in Punchestown had to spend the night indoors after being removed by the Civil Defence to the major events centre on the site. Leixlip and Maynooth experienced flooding although no damage to property was reported.

In County Laois the Ballyroan to Portlaoise Road was flooded at Cashel Cross after a river burst its banks. In County Offaly, the Tullamore Show, due to take place that day, was cancelled for the second consecutive year due to the weather. Dublin Fire Brigade said all areas of the capital had been affected by overnight flooding, particularly in Swords and Drumcondra. Houses in the Knocklyon and Firhouse areas of south Dublin were flooded. The Civil Defence was also called in to help pump water. On the M50 a bus full of people journeying to Dublin Airport was marooned in the floods and had to be pulled free with the aid of a tractor. Racing at the Curragh was cancelled because of a waterlogged track.

=== 12 August ===
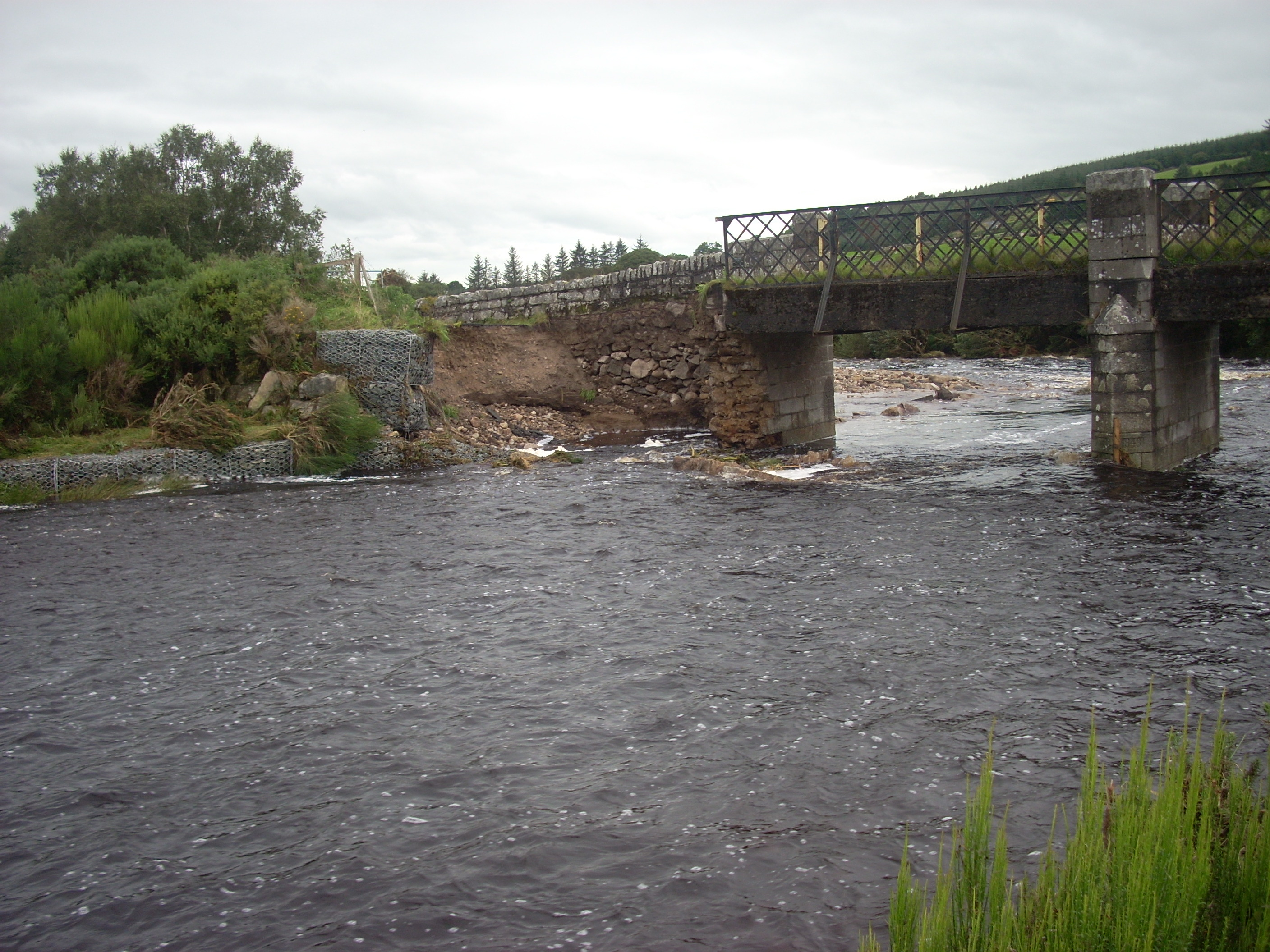
Ballysmuttan Bridge over the River Liffey in County Wicklow was severely damaged in August 2008

Heavy rainfall in Dublin led to flooding and collisions on commuter routes. Dublin City Council described the situation as "serious". In Mulhuddart the Church Road was reported as closed at the cemetery through to the Hollystown Golf Club. Two open manholes were reported; one at the Drumcondra/Home Farm Rd junction, another outbound on the Ballymun Road outside the library, resulting in a flooded bus lane. The N3 at Blanchardstown was closed between the two exit slips which access the Blanchardstown Town Centre. Traffic was diverted around the flooded area via the Snugborough and Mulhuddart interchanges. The left lane of the M50 Southbound at J5 Finglas was closed due to flooding. There were reports of "a lot of surface water" on the M50 at J4 Ballymun in both directions. Flooding was seen at the Strawberry Beds approaching Lucan and on Tandys Lane in Lucan village, from the Old Swords Road to Coolock Lane, and at the Griffith Ave Ballymun Road junction. The flooding on River Road in Finglas was described as "heavy". Surface water and debris on the Killinarden side of the Killtipper Road at "a very bad bend" caused delays to motorists. On the Naas Road outbound there was surface water after Newlands Cross and at the Kylemore Road junction and Eglinton Road in Donnybrook was flooded. In Dublin city centre there was flooding at Westland Row, Lincoln Place. In County Louth, the R173 Carlingford to Newry Road was described as "flooded and impassable".

=== 13 August ===
Several hours of heavy rainfall led to flash floods in Dublin, with the Phoenix Park's Castleknock gate closed off and the road rendered impassable by the heavy floods. Some DART services were suspended for a time in the evening. Rail services between Drogheda and Dundalk were not operating overnight due to the flooding. In County Leitrim the Dowra to Drumkeeran Road was impassable when part of the road and a small bridge was swept away in heavy flooding. There were widespread road closures elsewhere including County Meath, County Louth, County Mayo, County Sligo and County Donegal. Homes in Dublin affected by flooding included those in Finglas (a number of elderly women were rescued from a complex), Glasnevin, Clontarf and Blanchardstown – including an area around Connolly Hospital in Blanchardstown. The N3 at Blanchardstown was closed for a time and there was flooding on the M50. Some lanes on the Naas Road and Carlingford to Newry Road in County Louth were also closed. In County Kerry, the main Castleisland to Killarney road was impassable in the morning due to flooding, with some cars being stranded. The Gneeveguilla Killarney road was also impassable after a river broke its banks. Ballinorig in Tralee town reported flooding whilst there was a tree down on the road to Ardfert quarries. A tree was also down on the road between Tarbert village and the ferry.

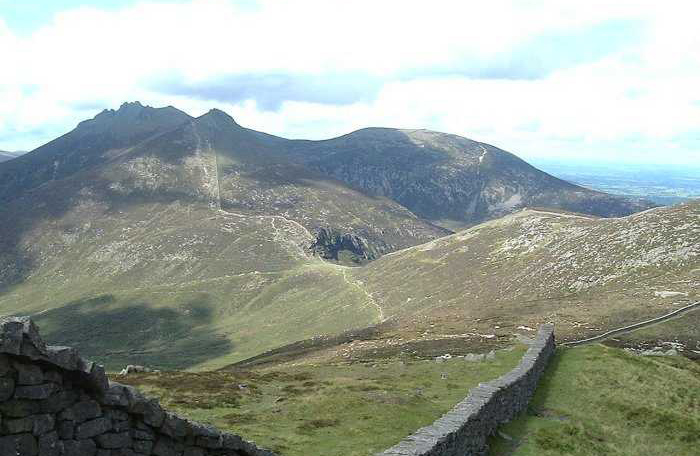
The Mourne Mountains became involved in the August floods.

In Northern Ireland, three teenagers from County Down were rescued from the Mourne Mountains in the middle of torrential rainfall. The three girls, aged between 15 and 17, awoke at 05:00 to discover their campsite had been washed away, with a swollen river determining the need for mountain rescue. The chairman of the Mourne Rescue Service, Ed Kilgore had this to say:

"If they had decided to try to get across the river it could have been nasty"

and said the girls were "wet, miserable and relieved" upon rescue. The girls were met by relatives at the foot of the mountain, with dry clothes given out by the rescue team. Elsewhere in the county, a man in his early 40s was killed as a result of a two-vehicle collision near Crossgar, with heavy rain blamed for the treacherous driving conditions. Five other motorists had to be pulled from their vehicles near Moira when flood waters entrapped them.

=== 14 August ===
The Irish Insurance Federation said the cost of compensating the victims of the floods could reach tens of millions of euro. Victims of a 2002 flooding in Ringsend called on the Irish Government to provide humanitarian assistance to those whose homes were devastated by the 2008 series of floods. In County Sligo, the Arigna to Geevagh Road was reported to still be blocked due to a landslide around Gleann. In County Leitrim, the Dowra to Drumkeeran road was deemed passable as were the Drumkeeran to Manorhamilton and Kiltyclogher to Glenfarne roads. In County Meath, the flooding receded on the N2 at Balrath near Kentstown making the road passable.

=== 16 August ===
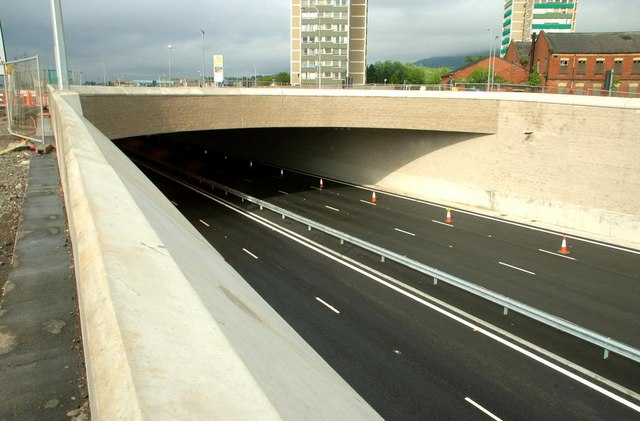
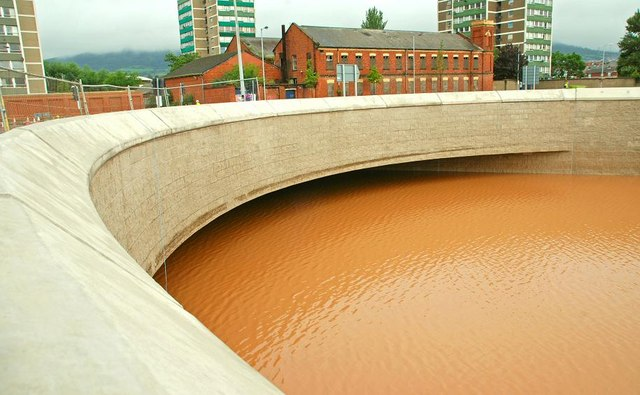
The new Broadway underpass in Belfast flooded to the roof in a few hours.

Severe weather conditions were witnessed across the country. The M4 between the Maynooth and Kilcock exits was closed as a result of "serious" flooding. The Clane to Kilcock Road was blocked and the Kilcock to Summerhill road was reduced to one lane due to the floods. Motorists were asked to use the M7 due to the Newbridge to Naas road being partially closed from Tuckers roundabout. The road from Rathangan to Kildare town was described as "impassable". The Clifden to Westport road near Letterfrack was blocked. In County Wicklow, Rathnew experienced what was described as "severe flooding" and the Wicklow to Rathnew and Trim to Dublin roads were impassable The Skreen to Walterstown road was closed, although the Navan/Slane road was later deemed passable. In County Tipperary, a bridge at Ballynunty collapsed following heavy rain. The Park Road in Ravensdale, County Louth was impassable. Severe flooding in County Monaghan blocked the Castleblayney to Lough Egish road at the bypass bridge whilst flooding was reported along the N54 Monaghan to Clones road and on the Carrickmacross to Ballybay road. The Tramore road in County Waterford was impassable from the Ballindud roundabout to Tramore. There were also reports of localised flooding in parts of Dublin.

A section of one of the busiest roads in Northern Ireland, the Westlink in Belfast, was closed after flooding put the new Broadway underpass under six metres of water. Five cars entered the underpass while it was under two metres of water and had to be abandoned. Northern Ireland's Minister for Regional Development, Conor Murphy, ordered an investigation into why the recently constructed £104 million (€132 million) underpass was flooded. It was the first time the underpass had had to cope with heavy rain. Northern Ireland's Environment Minister Sammy Wilson announced a compensation package for those whose homes were affected by the flooding.

=== 17 August ===
Carlow town was the centre of the flood alerts on 17 August. Rising waters from the River Barrow led to over 100 people being evacuated from a four-storey apartment block on Centaur Street. Kennedy Street was closed off. The Civil Defence was monitoring two other apartment blocks ready to evacuate them if waters rose further. Elsewhere in the county, the road between Tullow and Rathtoe was blocked after a two-car collision in which six people were injured. The wounded were brought to St. Luke's General Hospital in Kilkenny. Gardaí reported that there was still flooding in Daingean and Edenderry in County Offaly where the canal had burst its banks. There were reports of flooding around Clonygowan. In County Laois, Mountmellick's main street was flooded, whilst the Mountmellick to Ballyfinn (R423) and Mountmellick to Derryclooney roads were both impassable due to flooding. Diversions were in place on the N77 Kilkenny to Durrow road because of flooding at Ballyragget. In County Galway the N59 on the Oughterard side of Moycullen was partially blocked after a truck overturned. In Northern Ireland, the M1 reopened inbound from Black's Road to Stockman's Lane and outbound from Saintfield Road. The M2 fully re-opened. Stena Line's fastferry sailings between Rosslare and Fishguard on the 18th were cancelled due to severe weather forecast for the south Irish Sea, causing severe passenger disruption.

=== 18 August ===
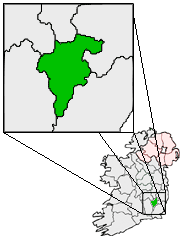
County Carlow was severely affected by flooding.

Carlow town remained the worst affected area by the flash floods. Roads were flooded in County Offaly, County Tipperary, County Kilkenny, County Laois and County Galway. Parts of Carlow town were under almost two metres of flood water after the River Barrow burst its banks following heavy rainfall. Approximately 100 people spent the night in a hotel when they had to evacuate their apartment block on Centaur Street. Others were ferried to and from work in the morning by the Civil Defence. Minister for the Environment John Gormley, visited Carlow to view the crisis, and said that the contract for flood defences would proceed "as quickly as possible". Staff at Winnie Dalgarno's flooded pet store in Graiguecullen had to take animals home when electricity was switched off. Winnie said: "We have lost a few reptiles, our birds have been badly affected, we had 20 hamsters floating, I have had to put rabbits in bird cages."

In Ennis, the body of 31-year-old cook and father-of-one, Przemyslaw Jablonski was recovered from the River Fergus. He was pronounced dead at the scene. Meath County Council advised people in Athboy to boil all water they used from the mains supply. Supply was shut down as a precautionary measure after a local river burst its banks, threatening to contaminate the drinking water supply.

Eircom reported nearly 4,300 faults over the previous weekend, with 6,500 reported faults that day. The worst affected areas included Clontarf, Blanchardstown, Phibsboro, Portmarnock, Leixlip and Clane.

Flooding at Portadown caused delays of up to 90 minutes on the Dublin to Belfast train service.

=== 19 August ===
Drinking water was delivered to hundreds of households in County Sligo where flood water caused problems with the fresh water supply. Sligo County Council issued notice for people to boil water before use. Boil notices were also in place in parts of County Meath – Athboy, Kildalkey and Ráth Cairn – following the bursting of a river's banks. Speaking on RTÉ Radio's News at One, Minister for the Environment, Heritage and Local Government John Gormley said despite the economic downturn, money would be made available to provide flood defences for Carlow whose flood waters were subsiding (although a number of streets remained closed with dozens of residents who were forced to leave their apartments still being housed in temporary accommodation). The Office of Public Works said that contracts for flood defence systems would soon be finalised for towns such as Mallow, Ennis and Clonmel. Speaking on Morning Ireland, Tom Sherlock, principal officer of engineering services at the OPW, expressed confidence that new flood defence schemes already in place in some towns would hold for many years.
