= Eddie Hyland =

Irish boxer (born 1984)

Personal information
- Nickname: Pride of Tallaght
- Nationality: Irish
- Born: Edward Hyland; 24 April 1981 (age 45) Dublin, Ireland
- Weight: Super featherweight

Boxing career
- Stance: orthodox

Boxing record
- Total fights: 18
- Wins: 16
- Win by KO: 6
- Losses: 2
- Draws: 0
- No contests: 0

Edward Hyland, more commonly known as Eddie Hyland, (born 24 April 1984 in Dublin, Ireland) is an Irish professional boxer who fights in the super featherweight division.

== Professional career ==
=== Debut ===
Hyland turned professional in November 2004 at the Altrincham leisure centre, England on an undercard of bill that included Jamie Moore and Brian Magee. In his debut Hyland fellow Buster Dennis on points over four rounds.

=== Irish title ===
He is the Irish super featherweight title holder, defeating Kevin O'Hara for the belt on points.
