= Celine Cawley =

Irish model, actor and businessperson (1962–2008)

Celine Cawley (1962 – 15 December 2008) was an Irish model, actor, and businessperson.

== Background ==
Cawley was born in 1962 to Brenda and James Cawley. She grew up in Howth, County Dublin, and had three siblings: Susanna, Chris, and Barbara. Barbara died of cancer in 1998. Brenda Cawley died in 2007. James Cawley was a well-known solicitor specialising in corporate law. He was a managing partner of legal firm Cawley Sheerin Wynne where Tony O'Reilly was also a partner. James Cawley later served on the board of O'Reilly's company Independent News and Media.

Cawley attended primary school at Malahide Community School Scoil Íosa in Malahide and also Santa Sabina convent Sutton and secondary school at Clermont Convent in County Wicklow. She briefly dated Mark McEnroe, the younger brother of tennis star John McEnroe. In 1990, she met Eamonn Lillis in Kinsale, County Cork. They married in 1991 at the Church of the Assumption, Howth. They had one child, Georgia, in 1992. Their relationship deteriorated but they remained married and kept separate bedrooms.

== Career ==
As a teenager, Cawley became a model and actor. She moved to New York City in 1982 where she worked for Vogue magazine, Elle magazine, Dior, Chanel, and Pierre Cardin. In 1985 she had a brief, non-speaking scene in the James Bond film A View to a Kill, opposite Roger Moore. As a result, she was described by the media as a "Bond girl". After her death, Moore paid tribute to Cawley, describing her killing as "a real tragedy". In 1990, Cawley set up Toytown Productions with her husband, Eamonn. It became a successful advertising agency.

== Death ==
Cawley was killed on 15 December 2008. She suffered head injuries in her home and died at Beaumont Hospital, Dublin. Lillis originally claimed that she had been attacked by an intruder, going so far as to name a local man as the culprit. He later confessed that there was no-one else involved and that he had fatally injured Cawley in what he claimed was a "heated and physical exchange". In 2010, after a 16-day criminal trial, her husband, Eamonn Lillis, was found guilty of manslaughter by a ten-to-two majority of the jury. In February 2010, he was sentenced to 6 years and 11 months in prison. After serving 5 years and 2 months in Wheatfield Prison, Lillis was granted a remission of 25% of his sentence for good behaviour, and was released in April 2015.
