= Dave Campbell (footballer, born 1969) =

Irish football coach and former player

Personal information
- Full name: David Martin Campbell
- Date of birth: 13 September 1969 (age 57)
- Place of birth: Dublin, Ireland
- Position: Defender

Team information
- Current team: Sligo Rovers (Opposition analyst and scout)

Youth career
- Stella Maris

Senior career*
Years	Team	Apps	(Gls)
1989–1990	Bohemians	62	(3)
1990–1992	Huddersfield Town	4	(0)
1992	Shamrock Rovers	3	(1)
1992–1996	St Patrick's Athletic	108	(13)
1996–2000	Shelbourne	87	(4)
1999–2000	→ Newry Town (loan)	6	(0)
2000–2002	Bray Wanderers	18	(1)
2002–2003	Dublin City	?	(?)
2003	Bray Wanderers	4	(0)

Managerial career
- 2007: Shamrock Rovers (futsal)
- * Club domestic league appearances and goals

David Martin Campbell (born 13 September 1969) is an Irish football coach and former player. He is opposition analyst and head of recruitment at Sligo Rovers.

Campbell was a defender who started his career with Stella Maris and went on to play for Bohemians, Shamrock Rovers, St Patrick's Athletic, Shelbourne, Bray Wanderers and Dublin City during his career in the League of Ireland. He also had a spell on loan to Newry Town in the Irish League.

== Career ==
After a protracted transfer saga for a then domestic record fee of £20,000 he joined Shels and made his debut for the "Reds" against Bohs in September 1996. Campbell was harshly sent off in a 1996–97 UEFA Cup Winners' Cup tie against a Tore André Flo inspired SK Brann.
