= UEFA Futsal Euro 2012 qualifying =

- Teams: (from 1 confederation)

== Preliminary round ==
Preliminary round consists of 24 teams, split in 6 groups of 4 teams. Round is played in round-robin format. Winners of each groups qualify for Qualifying round, where are joined by 18 best ranked teams.

=== Group A ===
Team	Pld	W	D	L	GF	GA	GD	Pts
Turkey	3	2	0	1	11	6	5	6
Montenegro	3	2	0	1	9	9	0	6
Moldova	3	1	0	2	8	10	-2	3
Switzerland	3	1	0	2	8	11	-3	3

=== Group B ===
Team	Pld	W	D	L	GF	GA	GD	Pts
Latvia	3	3	0	0	11	5	6	9
Iceland	3	2	0	1	15	10	5	6
Greece	3	0	1	2	6	11	-5	1
Armenia	3	0	1	2	4	10	-6	1

=== Group C ===
Team	Pld	W	D	L	GF	GA	GD	Pts
Macedonia	3	3	0	0	11	4	7	9
Georgia	3	2	0	1	13	2	11	6
England	3	1	0	2	4	9	-5	3
Estonia	3	0	0	3	4	17	-13	0

=== Group D ===
Team	Pld	W	D	L	GF	GA	GD	Pts
France	3	3	0	0	11	3	8	9
Bulgaria	3	2	0	1	14	5	9	6
Lithuania	3	1	0	2	9	10	-1	3
Malta	3	0	0	3	2	18	-16	0

=== Group E ===
Team	Pld	W	D	L	GF	GA	GD	Pts
Finland	3	2	1	0	18	2	16	7
Albania	3	2	0	1	11	17	-6	6
Cyprus	3	1	1	1	13	11	2	4
San Marino	3	0	0	3	4	16	-12	0

=== Group F ===
Team	Pld	W	D	L	GF	GA	GD	Pts
Norway	3	3	0	0	19	6	13	9
Andorra	3	2	0	1	9	9	0	6
Israel	3	1	0	2	7	11	-4	3
Ireland	3	0	0	3	1	10	-9	0

== Qualifying round ==
Preliminary round consists of 24 teams, split in 6 groups of 4 teams. Round is played in round-robin format. Group winners qualify for Qualifying round, where are joined by 18 best ranked teams. Qualifying round consists of 24 teams, split in 6 groups of 4 teams. Round is played in one way round-robin format. Tournament hosts are Azerbaijan, Netherlands, Poland, Romania, Ukraine and Slovenia. Six group winners and best five second-placed teams qualify for Finals, held in Croatia in February 2012. Croatia already qualified as host.

=== Group 1 ===
Team	Pld	W	D	L	GF	GA	GD	Pts
Spain ^{TH}	3	3	0	0	17	3	+14	9
Azerbaijan	3	2	0	1	13	13	0	6
Kazakhstan	3	1	0	2	5	11	-6	3
France	3	0	0	3	2	10	-8	0

^{TH} Title Holder

24 February 2011
15:30

Spain	4 - 0	France

Palace of Sport, Baku

24 February 2011
18:00

Azerbaijan	6 - 3	Kazakhstan

Palace of Sport, Baku

25 February 2011
15:30

Kazakhstan	0 - 5	Spain

Palace of Sport, Baku

25 February 2011
18:00

Azerbaijan	4 - 2	France

Palace of Sport, Baku

27 February 2011
15:30

France	0 - 2	Kazakhstan

Palace of Sport, Baku

27 February 2011
18:00

Spain	8 - 3	Azerbaijan

Palace of Sport, Baku

=== Group 2 ===
Team	Pld	W	D	L	GF	GA	GD	Pts
Russia	3	3	0	0	10	1	+9	9
Serbia	3	1	1	1	9	6	+3	4
Netherlands	3	1	1	1	8	7	+1	4
Finland	3	0	0	3	3	16	-13	0

24 February 2011
18:00

Russia	5 - 1	Finland

Topsportcentrum, Rotterdam

24 February 2011
20:30

Netherlands	3 - 3	Serbia

Topsportcentrum, Rotterdam

25 February 2011
18:00

Serbia	0 - 3	Russia

Topsportcentrum, Rotterdam

25 February 2011
20:30

Netherlands	5 - 2	Finland

Topsportcentrum, Rotterdam

27 February 2011
15:30

Finland	0 - 6	Serbia

Topsportcentrum, Rotterdam

27 February 2011
18:00

Russia	2 - 0	Netherlands

Topsportcentrum, Rotterdam

=== Group 3 ===
Team	Pld	W	D	L	GF	GA	GD	Pts
Portugal	3	3	0	0	14	2	+12	9
Belarus	3	1	1	1	5	8	-3	4
Poland	3	0	2	1	4	10	-6	2
Macedonia	3	0	1	2	4	7	-3	1

24 February 2011
16:30

Portugal	3 - 1	North Macedonia

Hala Widowiskowo-Sportowa Bbosir, Bielsko Biala

24 February 2011
19:00

Poland	2 - 2	Belarus

Hala Widowiskowo-Sportowa Bbosir, Bielsko Biala

25 February 2011
16:30

Belarus	1 - 5	Portugal

Hala Widowiskowo-Sportowa Bbosir, Bielsko Biala

25 February 2011
19:00

Poland	2 - 2	North Macedonia

Hala Widowiskowo-Sportowa Bbosir, Bielsko Biala

27 February 2011
15:30

North Macedonia	1 - 2	Belarus

Hala Widowiskowo-Sportowa Bbosir, Bielsko Biala

27 February 2011
18:00

Portugal	6 - 0	Poland

Hala Widowiskowo-Sportowa Bbosir, Bielsko Biala

=== Group 4 ===
Team	Pld	W	D	L	GF	GA	GD	Pts
Czech Republic	3	2	0	1	9	7	+2	6
Romania	3	2	0	1	9	7	+2	6
Slovakia	3	2	0	1	13	10	+3	6
Norway	3	0	0	3	4	11	-7	0

24 February 2011
15:30

Czech Republic	4 - 3	Norway

Sala Polivalentă, Târgu Mureș

24 February 2011
18:00

Romania	5 - 6	Slovakia

Sala Polivalentă, Târgu Mureș

25 February 2011
15:30

Slovakia	3 - 5	Czech Republic

Sala Polivalentă, Târgu Mureș

25 February 2011
18:00

Romania	3 - 1	Norway

Sala Polivalentă, Târgu Mureș

27 February 2011
15:30

Norway	0 - 4	Slovakia

Sala Polivalentă, Târgu Mureș

27 February 2011
18:00

Czech Republic	0 - 1	Romania

Sala Polivalentă, Târgu Mureș

=== Group 5 ===
Team	Pld	W	D	L	GF	GA	GD	Pts
Ukraine	3	3	0	0	20	6	+14	9
Turkey	3	2	0	1	8	16	-8	6
Hungary	3	1	0	2	7	10	-3	3
Belgium	3	0	0	3	8	11	-3	0

24 February 2011
16:00

Ukraine	4 - 3	Belgium

Palace of Sports "Lokomotyv", Kharkiv

24 February 2011
18:30

Hungary	2 - 3	Turkey

Palace of Sports "Lokomotyv", Kharkiv

25 February 2011
16:00

Belgium	3 - 4	Hungary

Palace of Sports "Lokomotyv", Kharkiv

25 February 2011
18:30

Ukraine	12 - 2	Turkey

Palace of Sports "Lokomotyv", Kharkiv

27 February 2011
15:30

Turkey	3 - 2	Belgium

Palace of Sports "Lokomotyv", Kharkiv

27 February 2011
18:30

Hungary	1 - 4	Ukraine

Palace of Sports "Lokomotyv", Kharkiv

=== Group 6 ===
Team	Pld	W	D	L	GF	GA	GD	Pts
Italy	3	3	0	0	12	1	+11	9
Slovenia	3	2	0	1	9	6	+3	6
Bosnia and Herzegovina	3	1	0	2	4	11	-7	3
Latvia	3	0	0	3	6	13	-7	0

24 February 2011
17:30

Italy	6 - 1	Latvia

Tri Lilije Hall, Laško

24 February 2011
20:00

Slovenia	5 - 1	Bosnia and Herzegovina

Tri Lilije Hall, Laško

25 February 2011
17:30

Bosnia and Herzegovina	0 - 4	Italy

Tri Lilije Hall, Laško

25 February 2011
20:00

Slovenia	4 - 3	Latvia

Tri Lilije Hall, Laško

27 February 2011
15:30

Latvia	2 - 3	Bosnia and Herzegovina

Tri Lilije Hall, Laško

27 February 2011
18:00

Italy	2 - 0	Slovenia

Tri Lilije Hall, Laško
