= 2007–08 UEFA Futsal Cup =

Final positions
- Champions: (Russia) VIZ-Sinara
- Runners-up: (Spain) ElPozo Murcia

The 2007/08 UEFA Futsal Cup was a European futsal cup supported by the Union of European Football Associations (UEFA). It was held between 11 August 2007 and 27 April 2008. The final was held in Krylatskoye Sports Palace in Moscow, Russia and was won by Russia's Viz-Sinara Ekaterinburg.

== Participants ==
=== Clubs eliminated in Preliminary Round ===
Teams are listed alphabetical based on UEFA Official web page:

- (Cyprus) Ararat Nicosia
- (Netherlands) DE Hommel
- (Andorra) Granvalira FC Encamp
- (Scotland) Fair City Santos
- (Estonia) FC Anzhi Tallinn
- (Latvia) FK Kauguri
- (Germany) FV Eppelborn
- (Bosnia and Herzegovina) MNK Kaskada Gračanica
- (France) Issy Futsal
- (Malta) Jeepers
- (Albania) KS Ali Demi
- (Lithuania) FK Nafta Mažeikiai
- (Republic of Ireland) Shamrock Rovers
- (Austria) Stella Rosa Vienna
- (Switzerland) Uni Futsal Team Bulle
- (England) London White Bear FC

=== Clubs eliminated in Main Round ===
- (Azerbaijan) Araz Naxçivan
- (Greece) Athina 90
- (Moldova) FC Camelot Chisinau
- (Hungary) Futsal Club Gödöllö
- (Georgia (country)) Iberia Tbilisi
- (Finland) Ilves FS Tampere
- (Slovenia) KMN Puntar
- (Belarus) Mapid FUT
- (Bulgaria) MFC Varna
- (North Macedonia) KMF Alfa Parf Skopje
- (Sweden) Skövde AIK
- (Armenia) Polytechnic Yerevan

== Elite Round ==
=== Group A ===
	Team	Pld	W	D	L	GF	GA	GD	Pts
1.	(Spain) ElPozo Murcia	3	3	0	0	12	5	+7	9
2.	(Croatia) HMNK Gospić	3	1	1	1	8	7	+1	4
3.	(Serbia) Marbo Beograd	3	1	0	2	3	9	−6	3
4.	(Poland) Clearex Chorzów	3	0	1	2	6	8	−2	1

(Poland) Chorzów, 15–18 October 2007

ElPozo Murcia (Spain)	5–1	(Serbia) Marbo Beograd	October 15, 2007
Clearex Chorzów (Poland)	3–3	(Croatia) HMNK Gospić	October 15, 2007
HMNK Gospić (Croatia)	2–4	(Spain) ElPozo Murcia	October 16, 2007
Clearex Chorzów (Poland)	1–2	(Serbia) Marbo Beograd	October 16, 2007
Marbo Beograd (Serbia)	0–3	(Croatia) HMNK Gospić	October 18, 2007
ElPozo Murcia (Spain)	3–2	(Poland) Clearex Chorzów	October 18, 2007

=== Group B ===
	Team	Pld	W	D	L	GF	GA	GD	Pts
1.	(Russia) Dinamo Moskva	3	2	1	0	20	7	+13	7
2.	(Italy) Luparense	3	1	2	0	9	5	+4	5
3.	(Portugal) Benfica	3	1	1	1	13	13	0	4
4.	(Montenegro) Municipium Pljevlja	3	0	0	3	5	22	−17	0

(Italy) Padova, 18–21 October 2007

Dinamo Moskva (Russia)	10–1	(Montenegro) Municipium Pljevlja	October 18, 2007
Luparense (Italy)	2–2	(Portugal) Benfica	October 18, 2007
Dinamo Moskva (Russia)	8–4	(Portugal) Benfica	October 19, 2007
Luparense (Italy)	5–1	(Montenegro) Municipium Pljevlja	October 19, 2007
Benfica (Portugal)	7–3	(Montenegro) Municipium Pljevlja	October 21, 2007
Luparense (Italy)	2–2	(Russia) Dinamo Moskva	October 21, 2007

=== Group C ===
	Team	Pld	W	D	L	GF	GA	GD	Pts
1.	(Kazakhstan) AFC Kairat	3	3	0	0	14	8	+6	9
2.	(Czech Republic) Era-Pack Chrudim	3	2	0	1	12	7	+5	6
3.	(Slovakia) Slov-Matic Bratislava	3	0	1	2	9	14	−5	1
4.	(Belgium) Topsport Antwerpen	3	0	1	2	7	13	−6	1

(Czech Republic) Chrudim, 15–18 October 2007

Kairat (Kazakhstan)	4–3	(Slovakia) Slov-Matic Bratislava	October 15, 2007
Era-Pack Chrudim (Czech Republic)	3–1	(Belgium) Topsport Antwerpen	October 15, 2007
Topsport Antwerpen (Belgium)	1–5	(Kazakhstan) Kairat	October 16, 2007
Era-Pack Chrudim (Czech Republic)	5–1	(Slovakia) Slov-Matic Bratislava	October 16, 2007
Slov-Matic Bratislava (Slovakia)	5–5	(Belgium) Topsport Antwerpen	October 18, 2007
Kairat (Kazakhstan)	5–4	(Czech Republic) Era-Pack Chrudim	October 18, 2007

=== Group D ===
	Team	Pld	W	D	L	GF	GA	GD	Pts
1.	(Russia) Viz-Sinara Ekaterinburg	3	3	0	0	15	5	+10	9
2.	(Romania) CIP Deva	3	2	0	1	12	16	−4	6
3.	(Ukraine) SK Energia	3	1	0	2	8	9	−1	3
4.	(Israel) Hapoel Ironi Rishon	3	0	0	3	7	12	−5	0

(Russia) Ekaterinburg, 14–17 October 2007

Viz-Sinara Ekaterinburg (Russia)	2–1	(Ukraine) SK Energia	October 14, 2007
Hapoel Ironi Rishon (Israel)	3–5	(Romania) CIP Deva	October 14, 2007
Viz-Sinara Ekaterinburg (Russia)	10–3	(Romania) CIP Deva	October 15, 2007
SK Energia (Ukraine)	4–3	(Israel) Hapoel Ironi Rishon	October 15, 2007
CIP Deva (Romania)	4–3	(Ukraine) SK Energia	October 17, 2007
Hapoel Ironi Rishon (Israel)	1–3	(Russia) Viz-Sinara Ekaterinburg	October 17, 2007

== Final four ==
Note: Final Four matches were broadcast across Europe by Eurosport.

(Russia) Moscow, 25–27 April 2008

Semi-finals
April 25, 2008 Moscow
(Kazakhstan) Kairat	1
(Russia) Viz-Sinara Ekaterinburg	4
April 25, 2008 Moscow
(Spain) ElPozo (p)	1 (4)
(Russia) Dinamo Moskva	1 (2)

Final
April 27, 2008 Moscow
(Russia) Viz-Sinara Ekaterinburg	4 (3)
(Spain) ElPozo	4 (2)
Third place
April 27, 2008 Moscow
(Kazakhstan) Kairat	0
(Russia) Dinamo Moskva	5

=== Semifinals ===
April 25, 2008	Kairat (Kazakhstan)	1–4	(Russia) Viz-Sinara Ekaterinburg	Moscow
	Mokhov 9' (o.g.)		Prudnikov 25'; Shayakhmetov 34' (pen.); Makayev 36'; Agapov 39'

April 25, 2008	ElPozo Murcia (Spain)	1–1 (4–2 p)	(Russia) Dinamo Moskva	Moscow
	Ciço 4'		Pula 16'

=== Final 3rd and 4th ===
April 27, 2008	Kairat (Kazakhstan)	0–5	(Russia) Dinamo Moskva	Moscow
			Ivanov 6'; Tatu 17'; Rakhimov 36'; Joan 39'; Cirilo 39'

=== Final ===
April 27, 2008	Viz-Sinara Ekaterinburg (Russia)	4–4 (3–2 p)	(Spain) ElPozo Murcia	Moscow
	Makayev 6' Shayakhmetov 27' Prudnikov 35'; Chistopolov 36'		Kike 18'; Ciço 24'; Vinicius 30'; Mauricio 36'	Attendance: 3500

UEFA Futsal Cup
2007–08 Winners

Viz-Sinara Ekaterinburg
1st Title
