= 2010 in Ireland =

- Centuries: 19th; 20th; 21st
- Decades: 1990s; 2000s; 2010s; 2020s
- See also: 2010 in Northern Ireland; Other events of 2010; List of years in Ireland

This is a summary of 2010 in Ireland.

== Incumbents ==
- President: Mary McAleese
- Taoiseach: Brian Cowen (FF)
- Tánaiste: Mary Coughlan (FF)
- Minister for Finance: Brian Lenihan (FF)
- Chief Justice: John L. Murray
- Dáil: 30th
- Seanad: 23rd

== Events ==
=== January ===
- 4 January – Met Éireann said Ireland was experiencing its most extreme cold spell of weather since 1963.
- 5 January – A bomb alert on Dorset Street in Dublin was caused when officials at a Slovak airport planted explosives on an innocent civilian and allowed him to leave the country on Danube Wings Flight V5 8230 in a security test gone wrong.
- 7 January – Schools remained shut following the holiday period due to extreme weather. Taoiseach Brian Cowen makes his first comments on the matter. Schools remain shut anyway. Minister for Education and Science Batt O'Keeffe later changes his mind.
- 13 January – An Arkefly Boeing 767 flying from Amsterdam to the Netherlands Antilles was grounded at Shannon Airport after a man claimed there was a bomb on board. All 242 passengers and crew were evacuated. 44-year-old Jorge Flores appears in court in Ennis to be charged for this the following day.
- 22 January – The Waterford Crystal tourist centre in Kilbarry, County Waterford closed.
- 25–27 January – Taoiseach Brian Cowen joined UK Prime Minister Gordon Brown at Hillsborough Castle in Belfast for cross-party talks on the devolution of policing and justice powers to the Northern Ireland administration.
- 26 January – Edwin Curry from Kilkenny was sentenced to four years in prison after being convicted of 189 counts of indecent assault against children between 1964 and 1985.
- 28 January – Former national swimming coach Ger Doyle was convicted of 34 counts of indecent assault and one count of sexual assault against children in his care and sentenced to six and half years in prison.

=== February ===
- 3 February – a fireball was seen across Ireland when a meteoroid explodes at an altitude of 100 miles, and fragments entered the atmosphere. Public excitement caused Astronomy Ireland's website to crash.
- 8 February – George Lee resigned from Fine Gael and Dáil Éireann with immediate effect, nine months after his election.
- 12 February
  - Déirdre de Búrca resigned from the Green Party and Seanad Éireann with immediate effect and criticised her former party leader John Gormley.
  - A fire on Capel Street in Dublin destroyed a head shop and a sex shop and forced the street to be shut down for the weekend.
- 13 February – West Jewellers of Grafton Street in Dublin closed down after 290 years.
- 18 February – Minister for Defence Willie O'Dea resigned after a controversy surrounding his remarks on a rival politician's relationship with brothels. Taoiseach Brian Cowen assigned himself temporary responsibility for the Department of Defence.
- 23 February – former Green Party leader Trevor Sargent resigned as a Minister of State after accepting that he made 'an error of judgment' in contacting gardaí about a case involving a constituent.

=== March ===
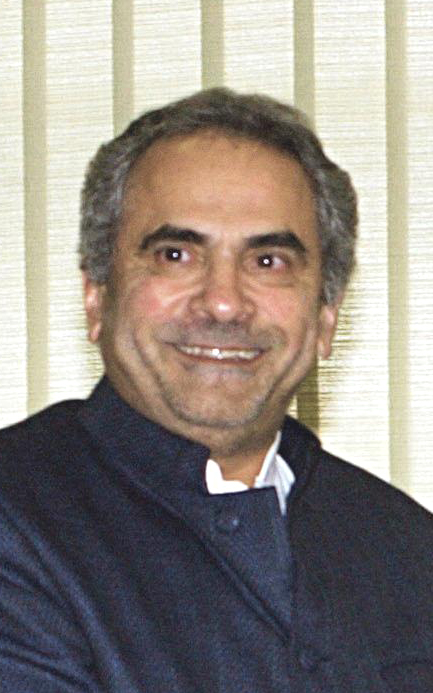
José Ramos-Horta, President of East Timor

- 8 March
  - Minister for Arts, Sport and Tourism Martin Cullen resigned from politics after seeking medical advice.
  - President of East Timor José Ramos-Horta began his two-day first official state visit to Ireland by meeting Taoiseach Brian Cowen, urging the country to continue providing economic support as a priority nation and receiving an honorary doctorate from University College Dublin.
- 9 March
  - Seven people were arrested, five in Waterford and two in Cork, over an alleged plot to assassinate Swedish artist Lars Vilks.
  - The Adelaide and Meath Hospital in Tallaght blamed "systemic and process failures" for more than 57,000 X-rays taken between 2005 and 2009 not being reviewed by medical professionals and admitted at least two patients received incorrect treatment, one of whom died and the other who is receiving cancer treatment.
  - A national strike by taxi drivers led to work stoppages at the country's three main airports, closed O'Connell Street in Dublin, and blocked other streets, while the High Court ordered protesters to leave their sit-in at the Commission for Taxi Regulation headquarters.
- 18 March – Former Chairman of Anglo Irish Bank Sean FitzPatrick was arrested at his home and has it searched under Section 4 of the Criminal Justice Act 1984 in Greystones, County Wicklow.
- Catholic sexual abuse scandal in Ireland:
  - 20 March – Pope Benedict XVI's special pastoral letter to Irish Catholics on the issue was published by the Vatican to be read the following day in churches.
  - 21 March – A man confronted Bishop of Kerry William Murphy in the pulpit in the middle of the Gospel at St Mary's Cathedral, Killarney, while protesters walked out during Mass at St Mary's Pro-Cathedral in Dublin.
- 23 March – The taoiseach reshuffled his cabinet.
- 29 March – The new Limerick to Galway rail line was officially launched, reopening the rail links between the two cities for the first time in 34 years.

=== April ===
- 2 April – Alcohol was served in pubs and hotels in Limerick on Good Friday after businesses were given special legal permission to do so because of the Munster versus Leinster rugby match in the Celtic League at Thomond Park. Drinkers in Limerick benefited from an "area exemption order", which was introduced in section 10 of the Intoxicating Liquor Act 1962. This exemption was granted by a District Court judge to cover a special event, enabling pubs in Limerick to serve alcohol between the hours of 6 pm and 11.30 pm.
- 15 April – Volcanic ash from the eruption of Eyjafjallajökull in Iceland disrupted air traffic across northern and western Europe, including Ireland.
- 30 April – RTÉ radio broadcaster Gerry Ryan dies at his home in Dublin, age 53. He is buried on 6 May.

=== May ===
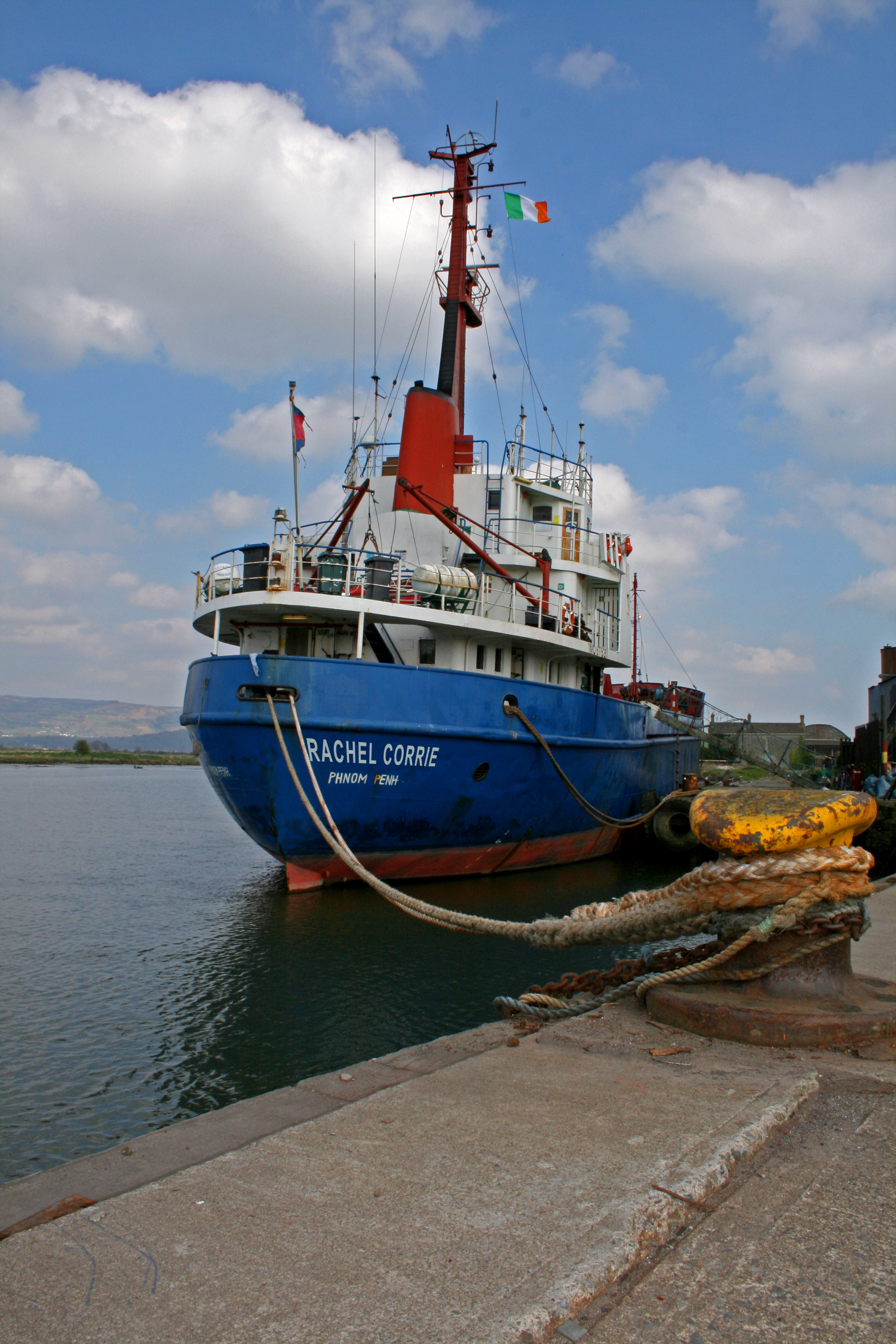
MV Rachel Corrie

- 1 May – A carbon tax on home heating oil and other fuels was introduced by the government.
- 2 May – A Red C Poll for The Sunday Business Post showed the Labour party was the second-most popular party in Ireland, and that it had overtaken the Fianna Fáil party.
- 3 May
  - A further volcanic ash cloud returns over Irish skies, causing more chaos. It went away again by the 23rd.
  - Ten protected birds of prey – red kites, buzzards, white-tailed eagles, a golden eagle and a peregrine falcon – were found poisoned to death in counties Cork, Donegal, Kerry, Kildare, Leitrim, Waterford, and Wicklow, in "the worst spate of poisoning in recent years".
- 5 May
  - A group of retired and diseased coal miners protested in Dublin in a bid for compensation.
  - James Dillon is sentenced to life imprisonment at the Central Criminal Court for the murder of Roy Collins in Limerick on 9 April 2009.
  - The government narrowly defeated an opposition motion calling for an immediate by-election in Donegal South-West. Fianna Fáil deputies Frank Fahey and Timmy Dooley accidentally voted with the opposition.
  - The skeleton of a child discovered in a sand quarry arrived safely at Donegal County Museum after it was thought to have disappeared.
- 6 May
  - Bishop of Clogher Joseph Duffy's resignation was accepted by Pope Benedict XVI.
  - The Supreme Court ruled that Acts of the Oireachtas or Statutory Instruments are not constitutionally obliged to be provided in both the English and Irish languages after a ten-year campaign led by Pól Ó Murchú.
- 11 May
  - Several substances commonly sold in head shops were outlawed with immediate effect by the government.
  - Several people were injured by police as protesters attempted to storm Dáil Éireann in a campaign against bank bail-outs. An investigation is launched.
- 13 May
  - Taoiseach Brian Cowen gave a speech in which he admitted for the first time that "domestic vulnerabilities" nearly caused Ireland's banking system to collapse.
  - Tánaiste Mary Coughlan dismissed concerns about Ireland's sovereignty being under threat by the European Commission's "peer review" policy, calling it "populism that is inappropriate and incorrect".
- 14 May – The High Court ruled in favour of shutting the landfill at Kerrdiffstown, Ireland's most complained-about landfill.
- 15 May – Hundreds of people protested against Health Service Executive plans to close Loughloe House, a retirement hospital for the elderly in Athlone.
- 18 May
  - Protesters gathered outside Dáil Éireann to condemn cutbacks by the government.
  - The Health Service Executive began its nationwide cervical cancer vaccination campaign.
  - Kieran O'Reilly was appointed as Bishop of Killaloe by the Vatican.
- 19 May
  - Bishop of Ardagh and Clonmacnois Colm O'Reilly's resignation was accepted by Pope Benedict XVI, but there was no formal announcement and the diocese was not sede vacante.
  - The government defeated by 77–72 a Fine Gael party motion calling for a date to be set for a by-election due in Waterford.
- 20 May – 186 Irish peacekeepers serving in Chad returned to Dublin, meaning no large battalions were working abroad for the first time in three decades.
- 21 May – The corpses of 40 children from Bethany Home in Rathgar were discovered in unmarked graves in Mount Jerome Cemetery, Dublin.
- 22 May – Thousands of people protested about the future of Wexford General Hospital.
- 25 May
  - Hundreds of people demonstrated outside Dáil Éireann in pursuit of job creation.
  - Captain Gráinne Cronin, the first female pilot at Aer Lingus, retired after 33 years.
- 26 May – The government defeated by 72–68 the Fine Gael Bye-Election Bill in Dáil Éireann] following the government's reluctance to hold by-elections for vacant seats in Donegal South-West, Waterford and Dublin South.
- 27 May
  - The Medical Council of Ireland began a fitness to practise inquiry into two doctors who removed the wrong kidney from "Master Conroy" at Our Lady's Children's Hospital, Crumlin, despite pleas to the contrary from his mother.
  - Amnesty International criticised the government's children's human rights record in the organisation's annual report.
- 28 May
  - The Health Service Executive revealed that 37 children died in its care since 2000.
  - The final part of the Cork to Dublin motorway opened in County Laois.
- 31 May – Eight Irish nationals were involved in the events surrounding the Gaza flotilla raid carried out by Israeli commandos in international waters, including former United Nations Assistant Secretary-General Denis Halliday and Nobel Peace Laureate Mairead Corrigan. Three Oireachtas members – Aengus Ó Snodaigh, Chris Andrews and Mark Daly – are denied access to the flotilla by Cypriot authorities the day before the raid.

=== June ===
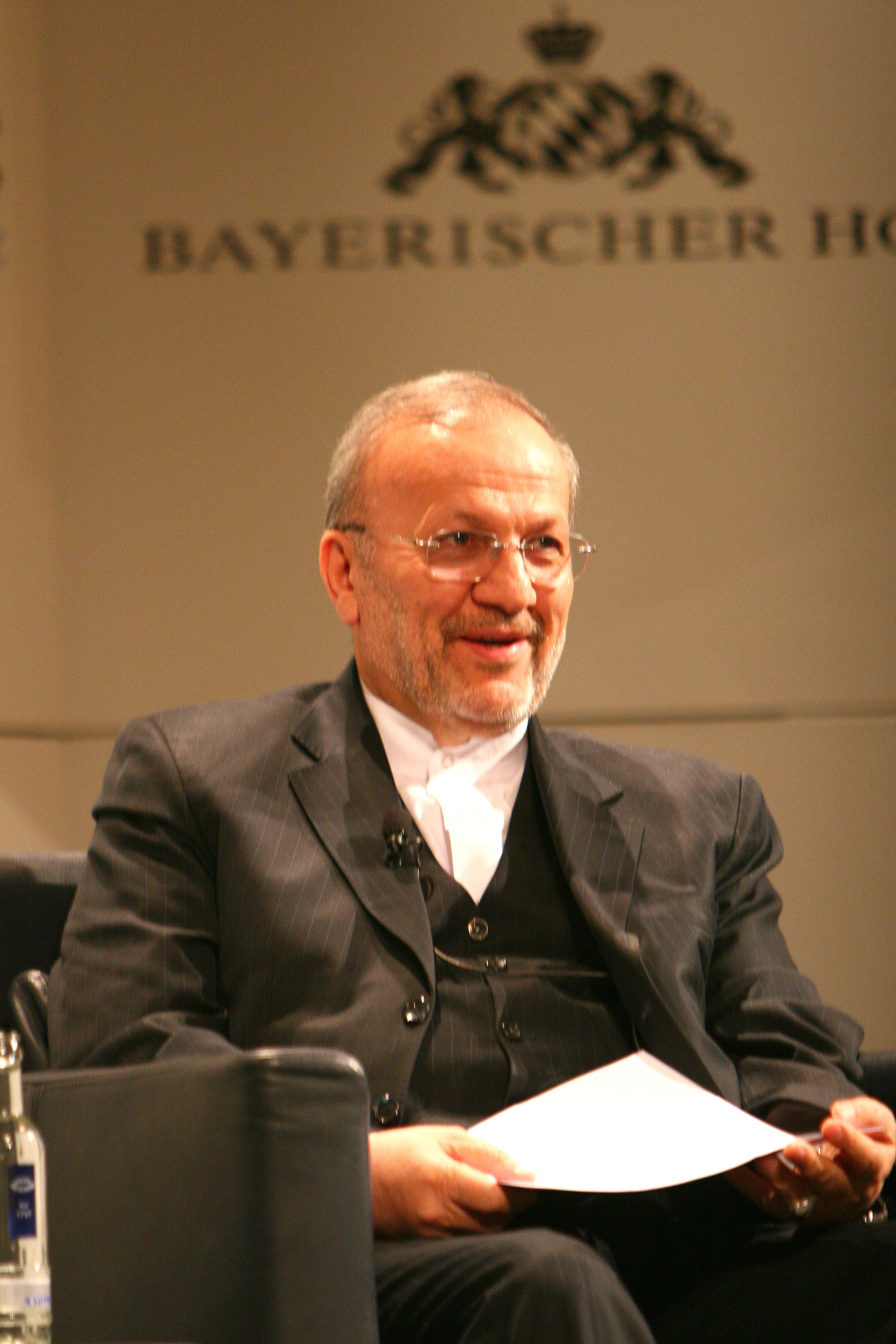
Iran's Foreign Minister Manouchehr Mottaki dodged protesters and flying eggs at the Institute of International and European Affairs on a visit to Dublin in June.

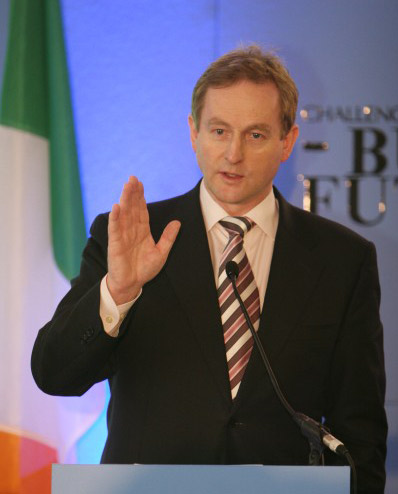
Enda Kenny, leader of Fine Gael, fought off a challenge from Richard Bruton in June.

- 1 June – Taoiseach Brian Cowen promised that the archive storage of electronic and paper records for future use is working fine.
- 3 June
  - Dáil Éireann was suspended for ten minutes of the morning due to rowdy scenes in the chamber as the opposition complained of "muzzling of parliament".
  - The returns for Ireland from the 1901 United Kingdom Census were made available online.
- 4 June
  - Fianna Fáil senator Larry Butler resigned the party whip due to an expenses scandal.
  - The M3 road was officially opened, two months sooner than anticipated.
  - The Health Service Executive said 151 children or young adults that it knew of died in the past decade, in addition to the 37 deaths in its care that it announced the previous week.
- 5 June – Fianna Fáil senator Ivor Callely resigned the party whip due to an expenses scandal.
- 7 June
  - Five Irish activists from the MV Rachel Corrie arrived back in Dublin after being deported from Israeli detention.
  - Dozens of people protested against the government's continuing attempts to close cancer services at St. Luke's Hospital in Dublin.
- 8 June
  - The Health Service Executive was criticised when a pregnant woman was told in error by medical staff at Our Lady of Lourdes Hospital in Drogheda that her baby was dead.
  - The Health Service Executive published a report saying an elder abuse service received more than 1,800 allegations of abuse in the past year.
  - The funeral of Daniel McAnaspie, who went missing while in state care, took place in Finglas West.
- 9 June
  - Iran's Foreign Minister, Manouchehr Mottaki, dodged protesters and flying eggs at the Institute of International and European Affairs in Dublin: two people were kicked and punched, while three were arrested.
  - Dermot Earley retired as Chief of Staff of the Defence Forces.
- 11 June
  - The Labour party became the most popular political party for the first time.
  - Galway City Hall exploded.
- 12 June – Thousands of people protested in Mullingar in fear of cutbacks at the Midland Regional Hospital, booing and heckling political rhetoric.
- Challenge to the leadership of Enda Kenny by Richard Bruton:
  - 14 June – Fine Gael party leader Enda Kenny dismissed his Opposition Spokesperson on Finance Richard Bruton after learning of his bid to overthrow him.
  - 15 June – Simon Coveney, Denis Naughten, Olwyn Enright, Olivia Mitchell, Fergus O'Dowd, Michael Creed, Billy Timmins, Leo Varadkar and Brian Hayes expressed their lack of confidence in Enda Kenny.
  - 17 June – Enda Kenny survived a vote of no confidence.
- 14 June – The Catholic Church paid out-of-court damages of more than €250,000 to a woman abused by paedophile priest Brendan Smyth.
- 15 June
  - The Saville Inquiry into Bloody Sunday in 1972 was published, prompting an apology from the prime minister of the UK, David Cameron, while the civilians targeted by British paratroopers were confirmed to have been wrongly killed.
  - The government survived an Opposition motion of no confidence in the taoiseach, Brian Cowen by five votes.
  - An Israeli diplomat was expelled from Ireland as punishment for the country's misuse of forged Irish passports in the assassination of Mahmoud al-Mabhouh in Dubai.
- 16 June – The Dublin Rape Crisis Centre reported an increase in calls of more than 41 percent from the previous year.
- 17 June – Ireland's Catholic bishops asked the government to provide a free vote for all TDs and senators on the Civil Partnership Bill, accusing them of trying to make same-sex relationships "as similar as possible to marriage" in what they perceived to be a violation of the Constitution of Ireland. John Gormley said: "I thought we had left the era of church interference behind us".
- 19 June – Around 40,000 people availed of the only opportunity to walk beneath the River Shannon via the Limerick Tunnel as it officially opened.
- 21 June
  - The government dropped its challenge to a High Court ruling saying Irish law on transgender rights breaks the European Convention on Human Rights, with Lydia Foy's 13-year battle against the government to be recognised as a woman ending successfully.
  - The High Court ruled that numerous houses can be repossessed.
  - Fine Gael councillor Matt Lyons was elected Mayor of Sligo; Fianna Fáil Councillor Michael Crowe was elected Mayor of Galway.
- 22 June
  - A new Waterford Crystal facility opened officially.
  - Ireland, represented by Minister for Transport Noel Dempsey, collected an award from the European Transport Safety Council for a 41 percent reduction in its road deaths since 2001.
- 23 June
  - The Railway Safety Commission reported that 2009 was a good year, with no passengers killed or seriously injured and only three trespassers and one construction worker being killed.
  - Dáil Éireann legalised the passing of files connected to the death of children in state care from the Health Service Executive to Mary Harney.
- 24 June
  - Authorities investigated a Health Service Executive training fund from which 31 trips abroad were extracted, including trips to Australia, Hong Kong, the United Kingdom and the United States. The HSE complains about it.
  - Mary Harney promised she would not sell off the site of St. Luke's Hospital after she merged it into the Health Service Executive.
  - the International Monetary Fund released the findings on Ireland that were collected over two weeks in May by a delegation.
  - Labour party councillor Mick O'Connell was elected Lord Mayor of Cork.
- 25 June – Taoiseach Brian Cowen and Minister for Communications, Energy and Natural Resources Eamon Ryan attended a meeting of the British–Irish Council in Guernsey.
- 26 June
  - Thousands of people paraded as part of Dublin Pride.
  - Diocese of Cloyne child protection delegate Father Bill Bermingham resigned after mishandling a sexual abuse accusation made against a priest.
- 28 June
  - The High Court granted permission for 13 repossessions.
  - The Health Service Executive announced the closure of Louth County Hospital's emergency department, despite years of campaigning by local people for it to be kept open.
  - Fine Gael councillor Gerry Breen was elected Lord Mayor of Dublin; Fine Gael councillor Marie Byrne was elected Mayor of Limerick.
- 29 June
  - The European Commission extended the Bank Guarantee Scheme to include the rest of 2010.
  - One member of an alleged Russian spy ring operating in the United States was accused of misusing a false Irish passport.
  - The Wildlife Bill, outlawing stag hunting, passed successfully through Dáil Éireann, with the government winning the vote 75-72 (75–71 in a walk-through vote).
- 30 June – Mary Harney's Health (Miscellaneous Provisions) Bill, designed to dismantle the board at St. Luke's Hospital and merge the hospital's staff and assets into the Health Service Executive, passed through Dáil Éireann.

=== July ===
- 1 July
  - Dáil Éireann passed the Civil Partnership Bill without a vote. It is signed into law by the President on 19 July.
  - Fine Gael leader Enda Kenny named his new team, including his challenger Richard Bruton and former leader Michael Noonan, while James Reilly replaced Bruton as the party's deputy leader.
- 11 July – Eight people were killed in a traffic collision on the Inishowen Peninsula in County Donegal; it was Ireland's deadliest road accident.

=== September ===
- 14 September – Taoiseach Brian Cowen gave a controversial nine-minute interview to Cathal Mac Coille on the Morning Ireland radio programme from a Fianna Fáil think-in in Galway; the interview received international attention and led to increased pressure for Cowen to resign.
- 29 September – A male protester drove a cement truck as far as the gates of Leinster House early in the morning. It came with the slogan "Anglo Toxic Bank" and its number plate read as "bankrupt"; the man was promptly arrested by gardaí.

=== October ===
- 30 October – Ten thousand people attended a rally held in opposition to service cuts at Our Lady's Hospital, in Navan, County Meath.

=== November ===
- November – Tayto Park amusement park opened in County Meath.
- 1 November – Minister for Health and Children Mary Harney was pelted with red paint while attempting to open a mental healthcare facility in Dublin.
- 2 November – Teachta Dála Jim McDaid resigned from Dáil Éireann, causing a fourth by-election.
- 3 November
  - More than 40,000 students from across the country marched upon Dáil Éireann to protest against government plans to increase student fees, the largest student protest for a generation. The Department of Finance is occupied by some students who are then forcibly removed by gardaí.
  - The High Court ruled as unconstitutional the government's delay in holding one of (since yesterday) four by-elections due in the country, forcing the government to announce the by-election in the Donegal South-West constituency for the end of the month.
- 4 November – A review by Tallaght Hospital into the non-examination of 58,000 adult X-rays by a radiologist concluded that there were "serious delays in reporting results" and that two of the patients experienced delayed diagnosis.
- 5 November – Minister for Agriculture, Fisheries and Food Brendan Smith reused a press release to announce a free cheese supplement for the poor, angering the public and generating international headlines.
- 11–14 November – First Kilkenomics Festival of comedy and economics at Kilkenny.
- 12 November – Minister for Health and Children Mary Harney was pelted with eggs and cheese in Nenagh.
- 16 November – An unemployed father asphyxiated his two daughters, aged six and two, and killed himself by crashing his car into a tree in Ballycotton, County Cork. Two adults and two children were found stabbed to death in a house in Newcastle West, County Limerick.
- 17 November – Pensioners gathered in Dublin to express opposition to government plans to threaten the impoverished people of Ireland with further cuts.
- 18 November
  - The International Monetary Fund (IMF) arrived in Ireland, though Taoiseach Brian Cowen insisted they were not there to bail out the state.
  - More than 1,000 students marched through Galway to protest against government plans to increase student fees.
- 19 November – Dublin Airport's Terminal 2 opened.
- 21 November – Eurozone countries agreed to a rescue package for Ireland from the European Financial Stability Facility in response to the country's financial crisis. Protesters gather outside Government Buildings on Merrion Street; a ministerial car hits and runs over a protester who is then taken away in an ambulance.
- 25 November – 2010 Donegal South-West by-election: Pearse Doherty of Sinn Féin was elected to Dáil Éireann.
- 27 November
  - about 50,000 people took part in a March for a Better Way from Wood Quay to a rally at the General Post Office in Dublin to protest against government spending cuts and tax increases.
  - A significant amount of snowfall began and continued into December, as Ireland experienced its third major spell of snowfall in less than two years, with 9 February, and 10 January previous to it.
- 30 November
  - The Minister for Justice Dermot Ahern, announced he would not contest the 2011 general election.
  - Rory O'Hanlon, TD for Cavan–Monaghan and former Ceann Comhairle, announced he would not contest the 2011 general election.

=== December ===
- December – Senator David Norris attempted to read the names of Anglo Irish Bank's bondholders into the Seanad Éireann record but was interrupted and ruled out of order.
- 1 December – More than 1,000 students marched peacefully through Cork to protest against government plans to increase student fees, while dozens of students erected a tent on the grounds of the Department of Education on Dublin's Marlborough Street and hold a "surprise conference" early morning protest.
- 2 December – Amid continuing snowy weather O'Connell Street in Dublin was shut following an explosion from a gas leak inside Kylemore Café.
- 7 December – The 2011 Budget is announced by Minister for Finance Brian Lenihan Jnr.
- 9 December – Fianna Fáil's Seán Ardagh, TD for Dublin South-Central, announced he would not contest the 2011 general election.
- 13 December
  - State-supported Allied Irish Bank was forced by the minister for finance to cancel planned €40m staff bonuses following public fury and indignation at the prospect.
  - Fianna Fáil's M. J. Nolan, TD for Carlow–Kilkenny, announced he would not contest the 2011 general election.
- 16 December – Fianna Fáil's Beverley Flynn, TD for Mayo, announced she would not contest the 2011 general election.
- 17 December – Minister for Transport, Fianna Fáil's Noel Dempsey, announced he would not contest the 2011 general election.
- 18 December – Ireland's smallest surviving baby is born weighing just 14oz.
- 19 December – The lowest temperature ever recorded in Northern Ireland, −18 °C.
- 20 December
  - A prison officer was arrested after heroin, cocaine, cannabis, and prescription drugs were found strapped to his leg during a search in Mountjoy Prison.
  - The High Court ruled that public rights of way existed in the grounds at Lissadell House, County Sligo.
- 21 December – A total lunar eclipse during sunrise occurred on the winter solstice.
- 22 December – A Galway pensioner died in Ireland's first case of death by spontaneous combustion.
- 25 December – December 2010 was the coldest on record, with a temperature of -17.5 °C recorded in Straide, County Mayo.
- 30 December – Controversial former taoiseach, Fianna Fáil's Bertie Ahern, announced he would not contest the 2011 general election.

=== Full date unknown ===
- VenueOne, an internet start-up company was founded.

== Arts, literature and sciences ==
- 4 January – Colm Tóibín won the prize for fiction at the 2009 Costa Book Awards for his sixth novel Brooklyn.
- 20 February – the 7th Irish Film and Television Awards take place at the Burlington Hotel in Dublin.
- 7 March – Richard Baneham won the Academy Award for Best Visual Effects for his work on Avatar at the 82nd Academy Awards. Four other nominations were unsuccessful.
- 10 June – Teagasc and University College Cork scientists won the International Dairy Federation's Elie Metchnikoff Prize in Microbiology for their study of lactic acid bacteria.
- 17 June – Gerbrand Bakker won the International Dublin Literary Award for his novel The Twin (Boven is het stil).
- 21 June – the Criminal Courts of Justice won the Irish Architecture Awards's Public Choice Award.
- 30 June – Harry Clifton was appointed Ireland Professor of Poetry, succeeding Michael Longley.
- 26 July – Dublin was named the fourth City of Literature, a permanent title, by UNESCO.
- 27 July – Emma Donoghue (Room) and Paul Murray (Skippy Dies) were included on the longlist for the Man Booker Prize.
- 27 August – architects De Blacam & Meagher were the principal exhibitors in the Irish Pavilion at the Venice Biennale.
- 2 September – Seamus Heaney's poetry collection Human Chain was published and nominated for the 2010 Forward Poetry Prize. It wins on 6 October.
- October – Leanne O'Sullivan was awarded the Rooney Prize for Irish Literature for Cailleach: The Hag of Beara.
- Book censorship in the Republic of Ireland by the state ceased as all prior bans expired.

== Sport ==
=== Association football ===
==== Friendly matches ====
- 2 March – Brazil 2–0 Ireland (Emirates Stadium, London). The fixture was part of FIFA's compensation to Ireland for the controversy surrounding the France v Ireland 2010 FIFA World Cup play-off.
- 25 May – Ireland 2–1 Paraguay (RDS, Dublin)
- 28 May – Ireland 3–0 Algeria (RDS, Dublin)

Second and third full internationals to be played at the RDS, and first since 1992.

- 4 August – Airtricty League XI 1–7 Manchester United. United played against a League of Ireland Select XI in the first association football match at the new Aviva Stadium in Dublin.
- 11 August – Ireland 0–1 Argentina (Aviva Stadium, Dublin). First Irish senior international match to be played at the Aviva Stadium.
- 17 November – Ireland 1–2 Norway (Aviva Stadium, Dublin).

==== UEFA Euro 2012 ====
- 3 September – Ireland 1–0 Armenia (Hanrapetakan Stadium, Yerevan)
- 7 September – Ireland 3–1 Andorra (Aviva Stadium, Dublin).
- 8 October – Ireland 2–3 Russia (Aviva Stadium, Dublin).
- 12 October – Ireland 1–1 Slovakia (Stadium Pod Dubnom, Žilina).

==== 2010 League of Ireland ====
- 6 March – Beginning of League of Ireland season.
- 25 September – Sligo Rovers won the 2010 League of Ireland Cup.
- 29 October – End of League of Ireland season. Shamrock Rovers won the League.
- 14 November – Sligo Rovers won the 2010 FAI Cup.

=== Athletics ===
- 12 December – Ireland's Men's team claimed a gold medal in the Under-23 event at the European Cross Country Championships in Albufeira, Portugal. The Irish team of David McCarthy, Brendan O'Neill, Michael Mulhaire and David Rooney saw off the challenge of France and Spain to claim gold.

=== Boxing ===
- 19 February – Bernard Dunne announced his retirement from the sport.

=== Car racing ===
- 19 June – A co-driver died during the Donegal International Rally, the first time a competitor was killed in this event, and it ended. A memorial service was held for him the following day.

=== Gaelic games ===
- All-Ireland Senior Hurling Championship, May 2010 – September 2010 – Title won by Tipperary.
- All-Ireland Senior Football Championship, May 2010 – September 2010 – Title won by Cork.
- 11 July – Fans attacked the referee on the Croke Park pitch after a controversial ending to the 2010 Leinster Senior Football Championship Final between Louth and Meath.

=== Golf ===
- 20/21 June – Graeme McDowell won the 2010 U.S. Open, becoming the first European to do so since 1970.

=== International rules football ===
- Announced on 19 February:
  - 23 October – Ireland vs Australia (Gaelic Grounds, Limerick)
  - 30 October – Ireland vs Australia (Croke Park, Dublin)

=== Rugby union ===
==== Six Nations ====
- 6 February – Ireland 29-11 Italy
- 13 February – France 33-10 Ireland
- 27 February – England 16–20 Ireland
- 13 March – Ireland 27–12 Wales
- 20 March – Ireland 23–20 Scotland

John Hayes and Brian O'Driscoll achieved 100 caps against England and Wales respectively, the first and second Irish players to do so.
Tommy Bowe was nominated for "Player of the Championship". He won.

==== Heineken Cup ====
- Munster & Leinster were both defeated in the Heineken cup by French clubs Biarritz and Toulouse.

=== Swimming ===
- 14 August – Gráinne Murphy won a silver medal in the 1,500m final at the 2010 European Aquatics Championships in Budapest, shaving eight seconds off the Irish record.

=== Tennis ===
==== 2010 Australian Open ====
- 16 January – Louk Sorensen defeated Daniel King-Turner of New Zealand by 6–4, 7–6(3) to qualify for the 2010 Australian Open, the first Irishman to qualify for a main Grand Slam draw since 1985.
- 19 January – Louk Sorensen defeated Lu Yen-hsun, of Taiwan by 6–4, 3–6, 6–2, 6–1 in the first round of the 2010 Australian Open, becoming the first Irishman to win a Grand Slam match. He was defeated in the second round.
- 24 January – Sam Barry defeated Victor Baluda of Russia by 6–7 6–4 6–3, becoming the first Irishman to win a Junior main draw match.

=== Winter Olympics ===
- Ireland participated at the 2010 Winter Olympics in Vancouver. Included were Ireland's first bobsleigh team of pilot Aoife Hoey and brakewoman Claire Bergin, as well as Pat Shannon in the Skeleton and three skiers, including Niall O'Connor. Ireland's bobsleigh team faced a legal challenge from Australia who were later added as a 21st team.

== Births ==
- 14 March – Tiger Roll, racehorse.
- 17 March – Ruler of the World, racehorse.

== Deaths ==
=== January to July ===
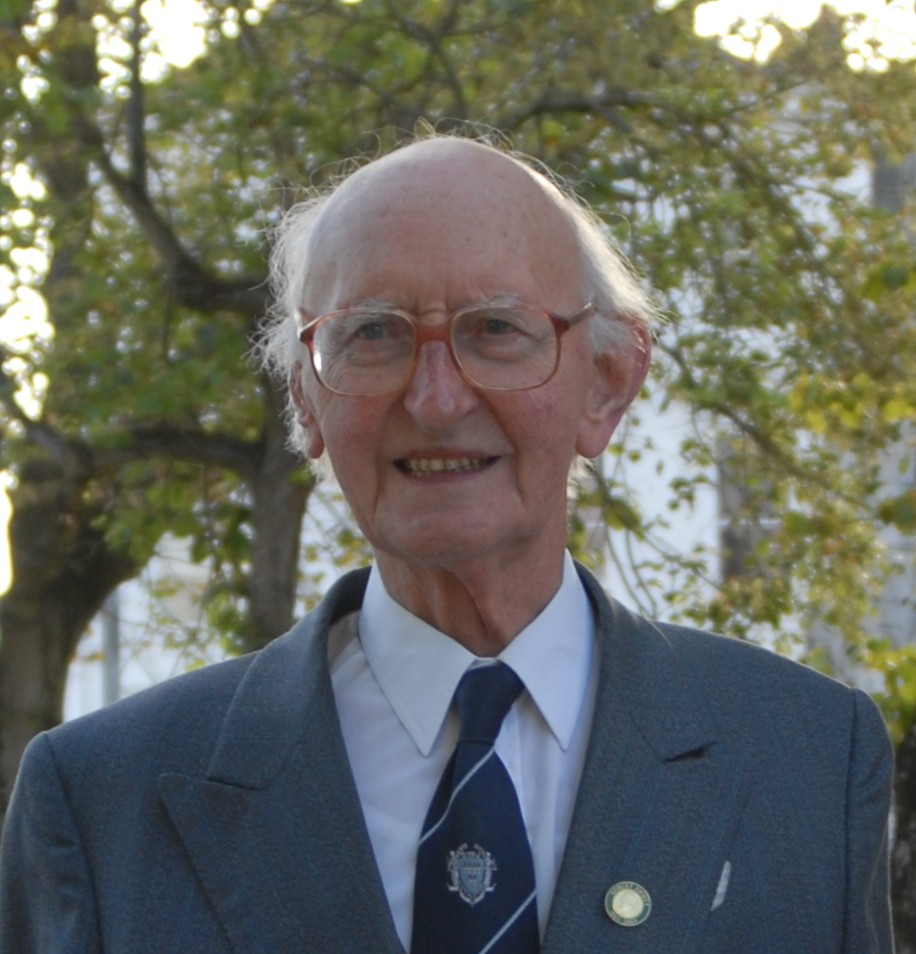
Tomás Mac Giolla

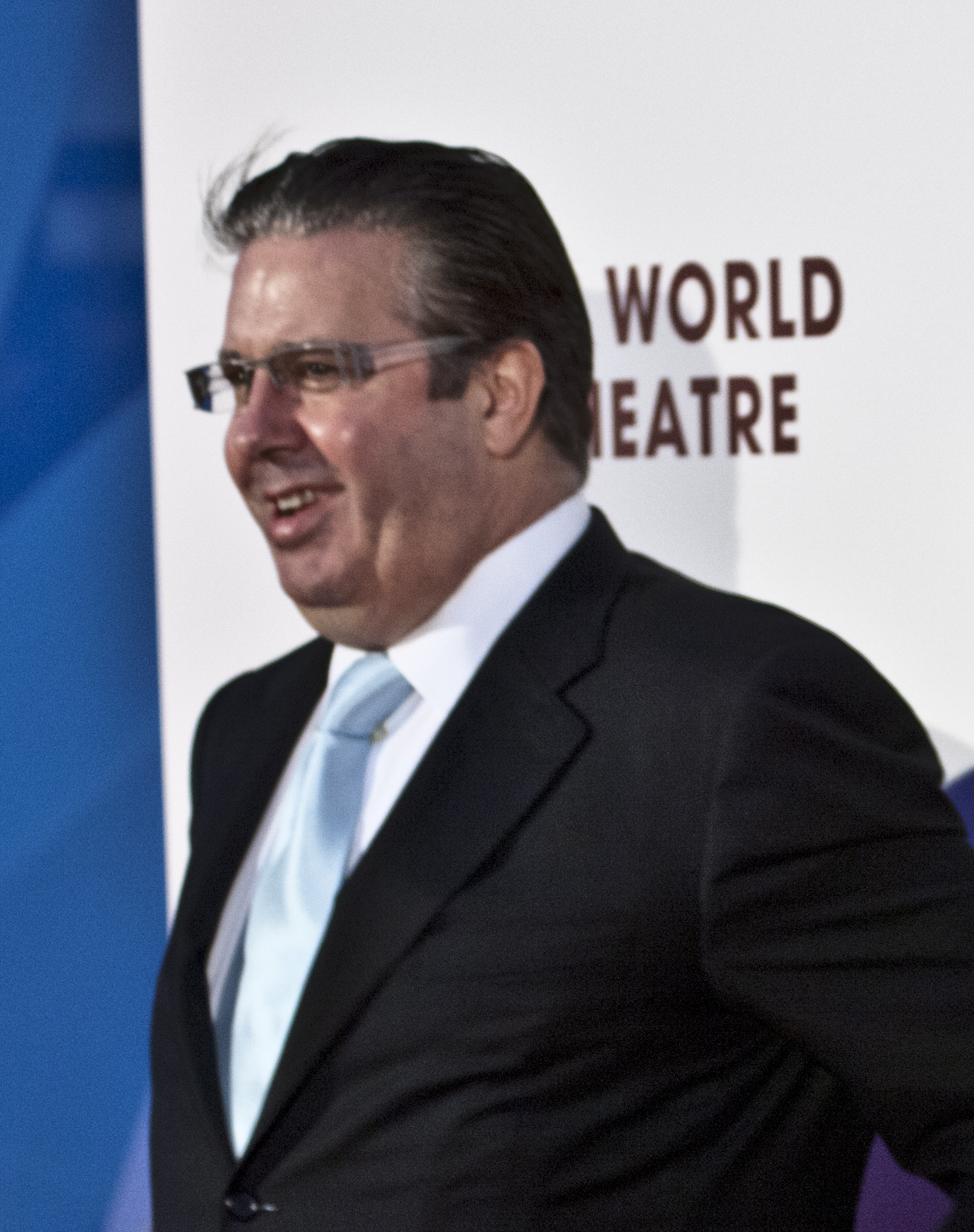
Gerry Ryan

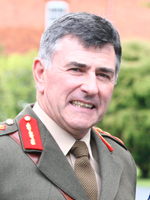
Dermot Earley

- 1 January
  - Denis Keeley, 79, long-term partner of writer Philomena Lynott, cancer.
  - Michael Dwyer, 58, film correspondent with The Irish Times, illness.
- 3 January – Dick Hill, 71, former controller of programmes of RTÉ Television, sudden death.
- 4 January – Donal Donnelly, 78, actor (The Godfather Part III, The Dead).
- 10 January – Danny Fitzgerald, 48, retired Limerick hurler and Gaelic footballer.
- 17 January – Bob Stakelum, retired Tipperary hurler, Gaelic footballer and referee.
- 25 January – Pádraig MacKernan, 69, diplomat, Secretary General (Foreign Affairs), Ambassador to France and United States.
- 27 January – Martin Grace, 67, stunt performer, (James Bond film series, 1967–1985), aneurysm.
- 28 January – Mick Higgins, 87, retired Cavan Gaelic footballer and All-Ireland-winning captain.
- 4 February – Tomás Mac Giolla, 86, retired Workers' Party leader and TD.
- 10 February – Andy Creagh, 56, retired Cork hurler and Gaelic footballer.
- 16 February – Ronan Lawlor, 21, jockey, riding accident.
- 19 February – Pádraig Tyers, 84, retired Cork Gaelic footballer. and Irish language scholar
- 20 February – Niall McCrudden, 45, optician and socialite.
- 22 February
  - Paul Clancy, musician.
  - Eugene Lambert, 81, puppeteer.
- 25 February – Henry Barron, 81, Irish judge (granted first divorce, 1997), after short illness.
- 13 March – Michael 'Haulie' Donnellan, retired Clare hurler.
- 14 March – Pat Fanning, 91, retired Waterford hurler and President of the Gaelic Athletic Association from 1970 until 1973.
- 15 March
  - John Mulhern, 69, horse trainer.
  - Peter Moore, 70, retired Meath Gaelic footballer and coach.
- 31 March – Paddy McNicholl, musician and music promoter (Connolly's of Leap).
- 3 April – Derek Crozier, 92, Crosaire compiler with The Irish Times since 1943.
- 18 April – John Forde, 89, former Mayo Gaelic footballer.
- 19 April – Philip McGuinness, 26, Leitrim Gaelic footballer and hurler.
- 23 April – Denis Donovan, 60, international bridge player, heart attack.
- 27 April – Mick English, 77, former rugby union player.
- 30 April – Gerry Ryan, 53, broadcaster and presenter of RTÉ 2fm's The Gerry Ryan Show.
- 2 May – Michael Sayers, 98, writer and pioneer of live drama.
- 9 May – Rita Childers, 95, wife of former President Erskine Childers.
- 12 May – Bree O'Mara, 42, South African-born Irish novelist.
- 14 May – Fred O'Donovan, 80, former RTÉ Authority chairman.
- 19? May – Thomas Caffrey, 92, confectioner.
- 20 May – Breandán Ó Buachalla, 74, Irish language scholar.
- 21 May – Bill Long, 78, author and broadcaster.
- 23 May – Liam Tolan, 17, Meath minor Gaelic footballer, road traffic accident.
- 25 May – Catherine Molloy, 66, general practitioner.
- 26 May – Kieran Phelan, 60, Fianna Fáil senator, sudden death.
- 29 May – Adrian Freeman, Mayo hurler, traffic collision.
- 1 June – Diarmuid Whelan, 39, history academic.
- 15 June – Gene Morgan, 84, former Armagh Gaelic footballer.
- 22 June – Dinny O'Shea, 78, retired Kerry Gaelic footballer.
- 23 June – Dermot Earley, 62, former Chief of Staff of the Irish Defence Forces and former Roscommon Gaelic footballer.

=== July to December ===
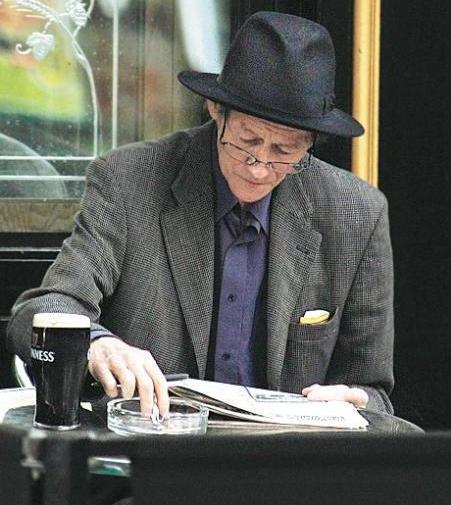
Alex Higgins

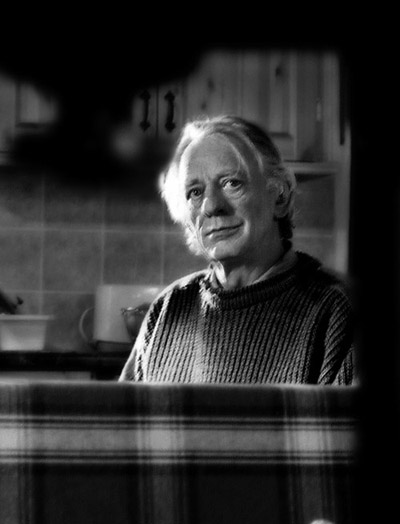
Mick Lally

- 10 July – Seán Dublin Bay Rockall Loftus, 82, activist, politician and lawyer.
- 15 July – Derek Nally, music promoter, manager and entrepreneur, heart attack.
- 19 July – Rory Brady, former Attorney General of Ireland (2002–2007).
- 24 July – Alex Higgins, 61, snooker player
- 10 August – Séamus Dolan, 95, former Fianna Fáil TD and Senator, Cathaoirleach of Seanad Éireann (1977–1981)
- 11 August – Eoghan Mac Aoidh, 24, guitarist, traffic collision.
- 13 August – Colin Stavely, 68, violinist and leader of the RTÉ National Symphony Orchestra.
- 20 August – James Dooge, 88, former Fine Gael Senator, Minister for Foreign Affairs (1981–1982)
- 31 August – Mick Lally, 64, actor (Glenroe).
- 21 September – Vinnie Doyle, 72, newspaper editor (Irish Independent).
- 5 October – Moss Keane, 62, former rugby union footballer with Ireland.
- 8 October – Maurice Neligan, 73, former cardiothurasic surgeon and co-founder of Blackrock Clinic, carried out Ireland's first heart transplant.
- 10 October – Ger Feeney, Gaelic footballer.
- 15 October – Jim Dougal, 65, journalist.
- 24 October – Carey Joyce, 88, former Fianna Fáil politician.
- 28 October – Paddy Mullins, 91, former horse racing trainer.
- 31 October – Johnny O'Connor, 82, former Waterford hurler.
- 4 November – Larry Roddy, concert promoter and music activist.
- 15 November – Moira Hoey, 88, actress famous for her starring role as Mary Riordan in The Riordans.
- 25 November – Tony Dixon, 52, disc jockey and blogger, brief illness.
- 29 November – Paddy Comerford, 80, stage actor and comedy performer.
- 22 December – Michael Faherty (also known as Micheal O'Fatharta), 76, Ireland's first recorded death from spontaneous human combustion.
- 28 December – John Doyle, 80, former Tipperary hurler.
- 29 December – Jimmy Coffey, 101, former Tipperary hurler.

== See also ==
- 2010 in Irish television
