= Diarmaid Ó Súilleabháin =

Diarmaid Ó Súilleabháin may refer to:

- Diarmaid O' Súilleabháin (bishop) (1924–1994), Roman Catholic Bishop of Kerry
- Diarmaid Ó Súilleabháin (writer) (1932–1985), Irish language writer
- Diarmuid Ó Suilleabháin, Irish sean nós singer from County Cork
