= McCrudden =

McCrudden is a surname. Notable people with the surname include:

- Dan McCrudden (born 1955), American soccer player
- Ian McCrudden, American film director
- Niall McCrudden (died 2010), Irish music promoter

== See also ==
- McCrudden light machine rifle, an Australian light machine gun
