= Drumardagh =

Drumardagh Droim na nArdach
- Townland
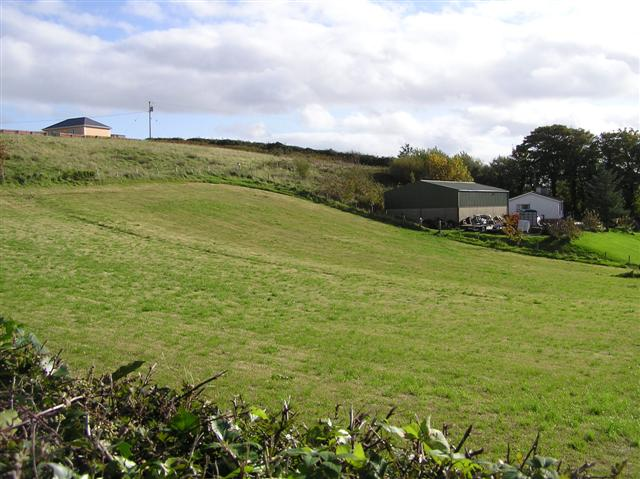
- Part of Drumardagh Middle

- Location in Ireland
- Coordinates: 54°57′18″N 7°39′00″W
- Country: Ireland
- Province: Ulster
- County: County Donegal

Government
  - Dáil Éireann: Donegal
- Time zone: UTC+0 (WET)
  - Summer (DST): UTC-1 (IST (WEST))

Drumardagh (Irish: Droim na nArdach) is a townland in the east of County Donegal in Ulster, Ireland. The townland is approximately 5 kilometres (3.1 mi) east of Letterkenny, in the Laggan district of East Donegal, just outside the village of Manorcunningham. The Isle Burn flows along the eastern boundary of the townland. The Irish name, Droim na nArdach, meaning 'ridge of the heights' or 'ridge of the high fields', and it is this elevation that gives the area its views over Lough Swilly, from Glenswilly to Inch Island, and beyond to the peaks of the Fanad and Inishowen peninsulae. Drumardagh townland, which is 330 acres (130 ha) in area, is in the civil parish of Leck in the historical barony of Raphoe North.

== History ==
Due to its elevated location, and the surrounding lowland isles on the banks of Lough Swilly, Drumardagh has a history of military significance. The first notable use of the hill in Drumardagh was as a strategic viewing point for the nearby Battle of Farsetmore on 8 May 1567. Drumardagh and surrounding areas of the Laggan district were heavily 'planted' with Lowland Scots settlers during the Plantation of Ulster in the 17th century. Hence, a version of Ulster-Scots was spoken in the area, in common with the rest of the Laggan.

In 1790, the British Army erected a stone building in the farmyard at Drumardagh, which they used as a cavalry and munitions store. On the north-westernmost tip of Drumardagh, directly overlooking Lough Swilly, trenches were dug into the hillside, at a place which is known locally as the Cannon Knowe or the Cannon Hill. These trenches were used as a means of maintaining watch over the nearby shipping channel, which at that time was a busy communications link into and out of central County Donegal. Several cannons have been recovered from this site, and on example is now under the care of the nearby Letterkenny Museum.
