= Denis Moynihan =

Roman-catholic bishop

- Bishop of Kerry
- Church: Catholic Church
- Diocese: Diocese of Kerry
- In office: 10 February 1952 – 17 July 1969
- Predecessor: Michael O'Brien
- Successor: Eamonn Casey
- Other post: Titular Bishop of Suacia (1969-1970)
- Previous post: Bishop of Ross (1941-1952)

Orders
- Ordination: 13 June 1909
- Consecration: 21 September 1941 by Michael O'Brien

Personal details
- Born: 16 June 1885 Rathmore, County Kerry, United Kingdom of Great Britain and Ireland
- Died: 5 December 1975 (aged 90) Tralee, County Kerry, Republic of Ireland

Denis Moynihan (b Rathmore, County Kerry 16 June 1885; d Tralee 5 December 1975) was an Irish Roman Catholic bishop.

Moynihan was educated at St Brendan's College, Killarney. He trained for the priesthood at the Irish College in Paris. Moynihan served curacies at St Hugh of Lincoln, Wavertree; St James, Bootle; St Cronan, Caherdaniel; and St John, Tralee. He joined the staff of St Mary's Cathedral, Killarney in 1922; and became its administrator in 1928. He was Bishop of Ross from 1941 until 1952 when he was transferred to Kerry. (Note: The name of the RC Diocese of Ardfert and Aghadoe was changed to the Diocese of Kerry on 20 December 1952.) He retired on 17 July 1969.
