= Bishop of Kerry =

Catholic bishopric in Ireland

The bishop of Kerry (Irish: Easpag Chiarraí) is the ordinary of the Roman Catholic Diocese of Kerry, one of the suffragan dioceses of the Archdiocese of Cashel and Emly in Ireland.

The Episcopal see changed its name from Ardfert and Aghadoe to Kerry on 20 December 1952. The bishop's seat (Cathedra) is located at the Cathedral Church Saint Mary, Killarney.

The current bishop is the Most Reverend Raymond Browne who was appointed Bishop of Kerry by Pope Francis on 2 May 2013 and received episcopal consecration at St Mary's Cathedral, Killarney on 21 July 2013.

== List of bishops of Kerry ==
Bishops of Kerry
From	Until	Incumbent	Notes
1952	1969	Denis Moynihan	Translated from Ross. Appointed Bishop of Kerry on 10 February 1952. Retired on 17 July 1969 and died on 6 December 1975.
1969	1976	Eamon Casey	Appointed bishop on 17 July 1969 and received episcopal consecration on 9 November 1969. Translated to Galway, Kilmacduagh & Kilfenora on 21 July 1976.
1976	1984	Kevin McNamara	Appointed bishop on 22 August 1976 and received episcopal consecration on 7 November 1976. Translated to Dublin on 15 November 1984.
1985	1994	Diarmaid O’ Súilleabháin	Appointed bishop on 29 March 1985 and received episcopal consecration on 26 May 1985. Died in office on 27 August 1994.
1995	2013	William Murphy	Appointed bishop on 17 June 1995 and received episcopal consecration on 10 September 1995. Resigned on 2 May 2013.
2013	present	Raymond Browne	Appointed bishop on 2 May 2013 and received episcopal consecration on 21 July 2013.
