= Diocese of Kerry =

Catholic diocese in Ireland

Coordinates: 52°03′34″N 9°31′07″W

Diocese of Kerry Dioecesis Kerriensis Deoise Chiarraí

Catholic
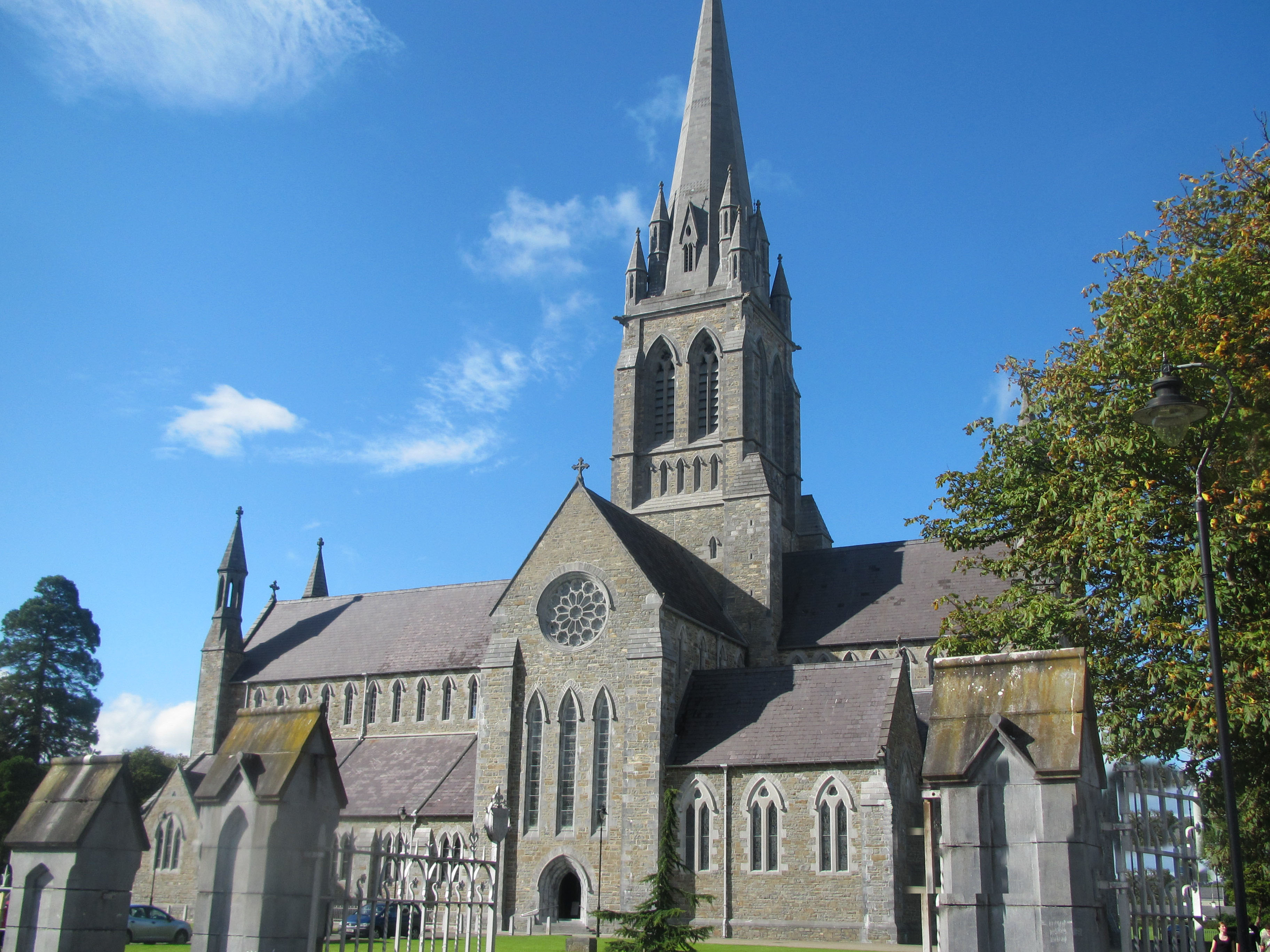
- St Mary's Cathedral, Killarney

Location
- Country: Ireland
- Territory: Most of County Kerry and part of County Cork
- Ecclesiastical province: Cashel and Emly
- Metropolitan: Cashel and Emly

Statistics
- Area: 2,047 sq mi (5,300 km^{2})
- Population: Total; Catholics: (as of 2016); 153,100; 146,790 (95.9%)
- Parishes: 53

Information
- Denomination: Catholic
- Sui iuris church: Latin Church
- Rite: Roman Rite
- Established: 12th century (as Diocese of Ardfert and Aghadoe); 20 December 1952 (as Diocese of Kerry)
- Cathedral: St Mary's, Killarney
- Patron saint: Brendan
- Secular priests: 54 (as of 2018)

Current leadership
- Pope: Leo XIV
- Bishop: Raymond Browne, Bishop of Kerry
- Metropolitan Archbishop: Kieran O'Reilly, Archbishop of Cashel and Emly
- Vicar General: Fr. Seán Hanafin
- Bishops emeritus: William Murphy, Bishop of Kerry

Website
- dioceseofkerry.ie

The Diocese of Kerry (Irish: Deoise Chiarraí) is a Latin diocese of the Catholic Church in south-western Ireland, one of six suffragan dioceses in the ecclesiastical province of Cashel and Emly.

The cathedral church of the diocese is St Mary's Cathedral in Killarney, County Kerry.

The incumbent bishop of the diocese is Raymond Browne.

== History ==
The diocese was established in the sixth century as the Diocese of Ardfert and Aghadoe.

Its name was changed to the Diocese of Kerry on 20 December 1952.

== Geography ==
There are 53 parishes in the diocese, which are divided between two civil counties: 44 in County Kerry and nine in County Cork.

The parishes are grouped into 12 pastoral areas, formerly known as deaneries.

As of April 2018, there were 54 priests in the diocese, six of whom were under the age of 50.

Aside from the cathedral town of Killarney, the main towns in the diocese are Castleisland, Kenmare, Listowel, Millstreet, and Tralee.

| Pastoral Area | Parishes |
|---|---|
| Beara | Adrigole; Allihies; Castletownbere; Eyeries |
| Castleisland | Ballymacelligott; Brosna; Castleisland; Killeentierna; Knocknagoshel |
| Corca Dhuibhne | Annascaul; Baile an Fheirtéaraigh; Castlegregory; Dingle |
| Duhallow Sliabh Luachra | Ballydesmond; Boherbue; Dromtarriffe; Millstreet; Rathmore |
| Iveragh | Ballinskelligs and Prior; Cahersiveen; Caherdaniel; Valentia; Dromod and Waterville |
| Kenmare | Glengarriff; Kenmare; Kilgarvan; Sneem; Tuosist |
| Killarney | Firies; Fossa; Glenflesk; Kilcummin; Killarney |
| Killorglin | Beaufort; Castlemaine; Glenbeigh; Killorglin; Milltown |
| Listowel | Duagh; Listowel; Lixnaw; Moyvane |
| Naomh Bhréanainn | Abbeydorney; Ardfert; Ballyheigue; Causeway and Ballyduff |
| North Kerry | Ballybunion; Ballydonoghue; Ballylongford; Tarbert |
| Tralee | Spa; Our Lady and St Brendan's; St John's |

== Ordinaries ==
The following is a list of bishops since the name of the diocese was changed in 1952:

- Denis Moynihan (1952–1969)
- Éamonn Casey (1969–1976)
- Kevin McNamara (1976–1984)
- Diarmuid ó Súilleabháin (1985–1994)
- William Murphy (1995–2013)
- Raymond Browne (2013–present)

== See also ==
- Catholic Church in Ireland
