= Diarmaid O' Súilleabháin (bishop) =

Roman-catholic bishop

- Bishop of Kerry
- Church: Catholic Church
- Diocese: Diocese of Kerry
- In office: 29 March 1985 – 27 August 1994
- Predecessor: Kevin McNamara
- Successor: William Murphy

Orders
- Ordination: 19 June 1949
- Consecration: 26 May 1985 by Gaetano Alibrandi

Personal details
- Born: 3 December 1924 Dublin, Irish Free State, British Empire
- Died: 27 August 1994 (aged 69)

Diarmaid O' Súilleabháin (3 December 1924 – 27 August 1994) was an Irish Roman Catholic bishop.

O' Súilleabháin was born in Dublin and studied for the priesthood at St Patrick's College, Maynooth. He was ordained Bishop of Kerry on 29 March 1985. He is buried at St Mary's Cathedral, Killarney.
