= Raymond Browne =

Irish bishop of Kerry

The Most Reverend Raymond Browne BSc, BD, LCL
- Bishop of Kerry
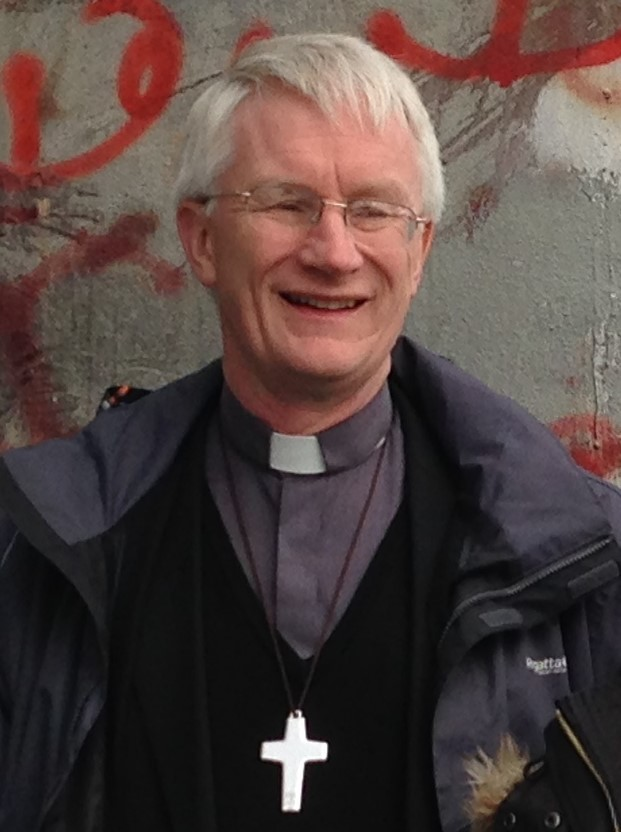
- Church: Roman Catholic
- Diocese: Kerry
- Appointed: 2 May 2013
- Installed: 21 July 2013
- Predecessor: William Murphy
- Previous post: Judicial vicar at the Galway Marriage Regional Tribunal

Orders
- Ordination: 4 July 1982
- Consecration: 21 July 2013 by Dermot Clifford

Personal details
- Born: 23 January 1957 (age 69) Athlone, County Westmeath, Ireland
- Education: University College Cork; Pontifical Irish College; Pontifical Gregorian University; St Patrick's College, Maynooth
- Motto: Love one another
- Coat of arms

Raymond Anthony Browne (born 23 January 1957) is an Irish Roman Catholic prelate who has served as Bishop of Kerry since 2013.

== Early life and education ==
Browne was born on 23 January 1957 in Chapel Street, Athlone, County Westmeath, one of seven children. He attended primary school at Saint Paul's Mercy Convent School and Dean Kelly National School in Athlone, and secondary school in Summerhill College, Sligo, between 1969 and 1974. Browne studied for the priesthood at St Patrick's College, Maynooth, between 1974 and 1982, completing a Bachelor of Science from University College Cork in 1978 and a Bachelor of Divinity from Saint Patrick's College in 1981.

He was ordained a priest for the Diocese of Elphin on 4 July 1982 in the Church of Saints Peter and Paul, Athlone.

== Presbyteral ministry ==
After completing a licentiate in canon law at the Pontifical Gregorian University in 1983, Browne's first pastoral appointment was as spiritual director at Summerhill College between October 1983 and June 1986. He subsequently served as a curate in Roscommon between September 1986 and July 1988, and in the cathedral parish of Sligo between 1995 and 2002.

Browne subsequently served on the Galway Marriage Regional Tribunal, initially as a staff member between July 1988 and July 1995, and later as judicial vicar between October 2002 and July 2008. He was appointed parish priest of Kilgefin, County Roscommon, in August 2008, while simultaneously serving as diocesan designate for child protection and assistance to elderly and sick clergy.

== Episcopal ministry ==
Browne was appointed Bishop-elect of Kerry by Pope Francis on 2 May 2013. He was consecrated by the Archbishop of Cashel and Emly, Dermot Clifford, on 21 July at St Mary's Cathedral, Killarney.

=== Fr Seán Sheehy controversy ===
On 1 November 2022, Browne issued a statement in response to controversial homilies given by Fr Seán Sheehy at Masses in Listowel. The homilies included criticism of what Sheehy called "sinful acts" such as abortion, same-sex relationships, contraception, and "transgenderism". In his statement, Browne apologised to those who were offended by the homilies, saying:

"The views expressed do not represent the Christian position. The homily at a regular weekend parish Mass is not appropriate for such issues to be spoken of in such terms."

Speaking on Radio Kerry's Kerry Today on 1 November, Fr Sheehy expressed his disagreement with Browne, accusing him of "sacrificing the truth, or muzzling the truth in order to appease people".

When Browne disciplined Fr Sheehy by forbidding him to say Mass in public, Sheehy responded, saying:

"I know myself that what I said cannot be disproven by any honest-to-God Catholic, Christian or Catholic teaching, and that’s the bottom line".

Some Catholics agree with Sheehy's position, pointing out that the acts mentioned are defined as sinful in Catholic doctrine.

Some conservative Catholics have condemned Browne's statement:

"Do not be under any doubt as to the seriousness of what the Bishop has done here. It is one thing to be condemned by the Irish Times, or RTÉ or the folks on twitter, but for a priest to be cancelled by his own Bishop for warning his flock about sinful behaviour is a disaster."
