= Slovak Police training explosives incident =

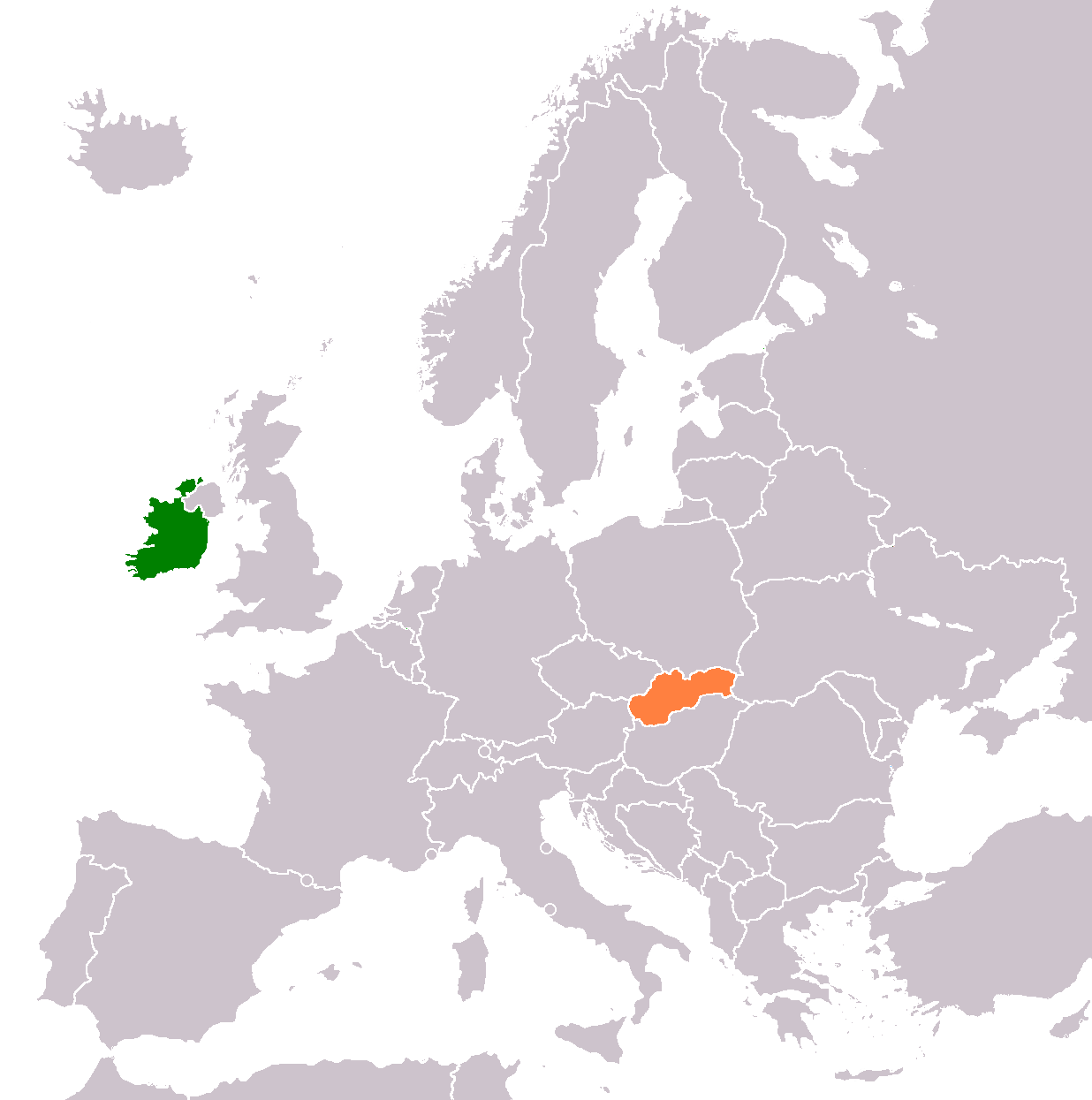
- Ireland (green) and Slovak Republic (orange)
- Location: Poprad, Slovak Republic; Dublin, Ireland
- Date: 2 January 2010
- Attack type: Bomb alert
- Weapon: 90 grams of plastic explosive
- Deaths: 0
- Injuries: 0
- Perpetrator: Slovak police

The Slovak Police training explosives incident involved a passenger on Danube Wings Flight V5 8230, a flight from Poprad-Tatry Airport, Slovak Republic, to Dublin Airport, Ireland, on 2 January 2010, that, three days later, caused an international incident due to the mistaken carriage of a sample of plastic explosive on the aircraft.

The explosive had been placed in a departing passenger's luggage in Poprad-Tatry Airport as part of a sniffer dog effectiveness test for checked in luggage. The test material was detected by the dogs. A Slovak security officer apparently then failed to remove it, and the bag was loaded onto a flight to Dublin. With security checks not generally performed for arrivals, the passenger arrived without incident and took the bag to his home in central Dublin. On 5 January, the area surrounding his apartment was sealed off and evacuated, while Army bomb disposal experts recovered the sample. The passenger was arrested but released without charge.

The Slovak authorities said that the pilot was aware of the mistake and had cleared the flight, and they had told Irish authorities and the passenger the same day. Irish authorities however said they were not made aware of the situation until 5 January. The Slovak government apologised to Irish authorities on 6 January, and promised an investigation.

At 96 grammes, the amount of explosive was reportedly enough to manufacture two hand grenades (although it was harmless in its transported form, having no detonator) and exceeded that used in the attempted bombing of a Christmas Day flight to Detroit, Michigan, days earlier.

== Slovak Republic hidden explosives incident ==
In an attempt to examine their airport security, Slovak government authorities planted two different illegal items (a small sample of real explosive and a scent sample) between random pieces of baggage at Poprad-Tatry Airport on the morning of Saturday, 2 January 2010. One of these was placed next to the baggage of a man described as a 49-year-old electrician, originally from the Slovak Republic but who had moved to Dublin, where he had been employed for three years. He was flying back to Dublin after spending Christmas in the Slovak Republic.

The sniffer dog located both samples, but as the officer on duty had been allegedly called off to another plane, he forgot to remove one of the samples. Baggage with the sample accidentally stuck to it was allowed to be loaded on an aircraft and flown to Dublin, departing on a Danube Wings flight at 11:00. The baggage arrived at Dublin airport where, as it was arriving and not departing, it was not checked.

== Communication failure ==
The police officer on duty, after realising his mistake, informed the Poprad-Tatry Airport flight controllers and in turn the pilot of the plane. The pilot evaluated the situation as not dangerous and decided to continue his flight. Poprad-Tatry Airport flight control operators sent a message to Dublin Airport and informed them about the problem. Dublin airport officially denied this, but passengers said that they were waiting for the luggage an unusually long time. Slovak police officials were not informed about the problem until 5 January, and they immediately reacted.

== Dublin bomb alert ==
On 5 January 2010, the Slovak airport authorities alerted their colleagues at the Airport Police Service stationed in Dublin Airport, who then alerted the Garda Síochána of the Slovak security breach. They also alerted the man via his mobile phone at around the same time, telling him what he had unwittingly done. They allegedly had earlier sent a telex in advance to alert Ireland. The man's flight details were examined by Irish authorities and his residence located and raided.

A major bomb alert took place in the area surrounding his apartment on Dublin's Dorset Street, near the city's important O'Connell Street. A section of the road was sealed off, homes were evacuated, and traffic on several nearby streets was diverted. Two streets were locked down for at least an hour. At 12:05, the bomb alert ended.

The man who had carried the explosives was detained under Section 30 of the Offences Against the State Act 1939 and brought to the Garda station in Mountjoy. The intervention of the Slovak government indicated that he was actually innocent. Irish authorities claimed they were initially misled by Slovak Republic into believing he was a terrorist. The man was later released uncharged after full details emerged.

== Substance ==
The sample contained 90 grams of RDX, in a plastic form and the size of two large coins. The sample was completely harmless without an initiator or detonator.

== Reaction ==
The incident prompted a debate on the legality of planting explosives on civilians without their knowledge.

Dermot Ahern, Ireland's Minister for Justice, Equality and Law Reform ordered an immediate investigation into the incident. He expressed concern that Ireland had not been informed by Slovakia of the danger it was in for three days. Detective Chief Superintendent Martin McLaughlin was appointed lead investigator of the investigation.

Opposition Fine Gael Senator Paschal Donohoe, in whose constituency the explosives were discovered, said the whole affair was "bizarre and extremely worrying", called on the Government to offer an explanation, and praised the emergency services for their role in a safe ending. Charlie Flanagan, the party's spokesperson for justice, described the incident as "a serious security breach" which "required an immediate investigation". The Labour Party's Joe Costello called it an "extraordinary affair" and asked how the Government was going to deal with Slovakia.

The Slovak Embassy in Dublin gave no immediate reaction to the incident, but Slovakia's Minister of Internal Affairs Robert Kaliňák expressed his "profound regret" in a telephone call to Ahern, and Slovakia has said it will assist in bringing the matter to conclusion. Kaliňák immediately banned the sniffer dog security checks in his country.

The newspaper USA Today called the incident "a security test gone badly awry". Online magazine forth's Jason Walsh commented: "We know airport security is a problem when European governments are planting plastic explosives on travellers".

== See also ==
- Foreign relations of the Republic of Ireland
- Foreign relations of Slovakia
