= Roy Earle =

Irish rossword compiler

Roy Earle is a former compiler of Crosaire, a cryptic crossword published daily in The Irish Times.

Roy Earle's sole predecessor was John Derek Crozier, under whose stewardship the crossword became enormously popular, inspiring a daily leaderboard, dedicated blogs and a book. Earle used the pseudonym Mac An Iarla, which is the Gaelicised form of his surname.

His first crossword appeared on Monday 24 October 2011. Earle was selected to take over after Crozier's 68-year run due to his stewardship of a blog, written under the pen name William Ernest Butler, dedicated to Crosaire solutions. He published the rationale behind each clue to the Crosaire Blog, which has been integrated into the larger Irish Times website and is continued by his successor, "Crossheir." His final Crosaire was published on 9 June 2012 after just over seven months on the job. Earle cited a change in personal circumstances as the reason for his retirement.

He was educated at Sandymount High School, University College Dublin and Sheffield University. He lives in the San Francisco Bay Area with his wife Paula and his two sons, David and Brian.

== See also ==
- Cryptic crossword
