= Poprad–Tatry Airport =

Airport in Slovakia

Poprad–Tatry Airport Letisko Poprad-Tatry
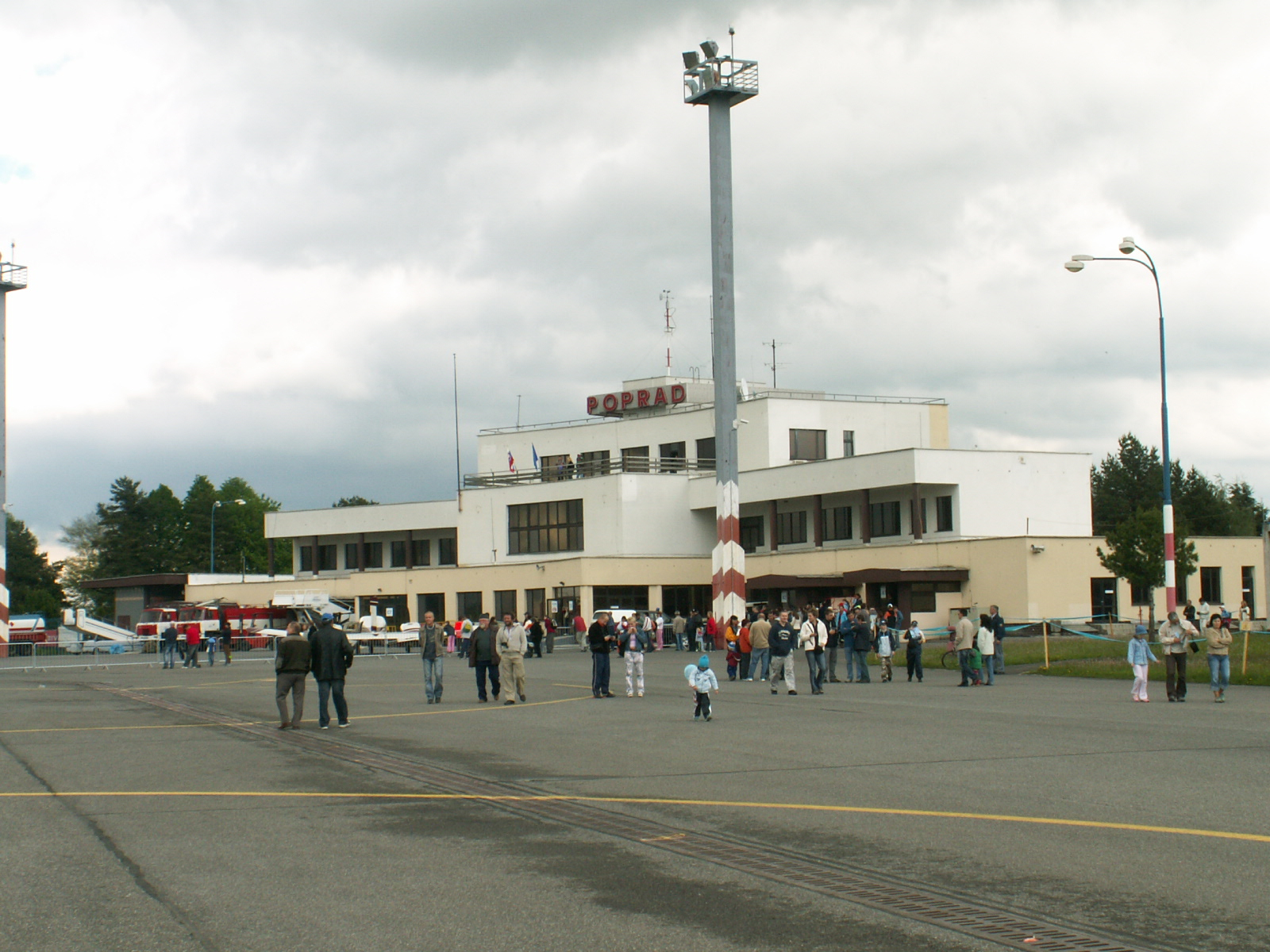
- IATA: TAT; ICAO: LZTT

Summary
- Airport type: Public
- Serves: Poprad, Slovakia
- Location: Poprad
- Opened: 1938; 88 years ago
- Elevation AMSL: 2,356 ft (718 m)
- Coordinates: 49°04′25″N 20°14′28″E
- Website: airport-poprad.sk

Map
- Location of airport in Slovakia

Runways
Direction	Length		Surface
Direction	ft	m	Surface
09/27	8,530	2,600	Concrete
07R/25L	2,493	760	Grass
07L/25R	2,493	760	Grass

Statistics (2025)
- Passengers: 111,658 ▼6.6%
- Movements: 9,712 ▼6%

Poprad–Tatry Airport (Slovak: Letisko Poprad-Tatry) (IATA: TAT, ICAO: LZTT) is an airport in the Slovak ski resort town of Poprad. The airport has one of the highest elevations in Central Europe, at 718 m, which is 150 m higher than Innsbruck Airport in Austria, but 989 m lower than Samedan Airport in Switzerland.

== Services ==
The airport serves schedule and charter airline operations, is a base for search and rescue air services, and handles general aviation. It does not offer any domestic flights. Charter flights are mainly operated in winter. Medical flights, VIP flights, ad hoc charters and ACMI flight also operate from the airport.

== Airlines and destinations ==
The following airlines operate regular scheduled and charter services to and from Poprad–Tatry:

Airlines	Destinations
arkia	Seasonal: Tel Aviv
Wizz Air	London–Luton, Prague; Seasonal: Gdańsk

== Statistics ==
Passenger throughput and operations since 2014:

Year	Passengers	Change
2000	12,780	N/A
2005	18,335	N/A
2010	27,693	N/A
2013	24,565	N/A
2014	31,694	▲29.0%
2015	85,224	▲172.7%
2016	84,030	▼1.4%
2017	80,605	▼4.1%
2018	88,387	▲9.7%
2019	94,249	▲6.5%
2020	24,189	▼74.5%
2021	15,481	▼36.0%
2022	56,500	▲265.0%
2023	72,500	▲28.3%
2024	119,506	▲65.0%
2025	111,658	▼6.6%

== Accidents and incidents ==
On 20 December 1980, an East German Interflug Flight 302, a Tupolev Tu-134 en route from Berlin Schönefeld to Budapest Ferenc Liszt received a bomb threat, saying that the bomb would go off once the plane descends lower than 600 meters above the sea level. Since the Poprad Airport is located at 718 meters, the plane was diverted there. Upon landing, a backpack was found which did not belong to any of the passengers.

According to Slovak police, during a routine training exercise involving police dogs at Poprad Airport on 2 January 2010, an officer from Slovakia’s Border and Foreigners’ Police put two pieces of a high explosive, hexogen (RDX), which experts say is more powerful than TNT, among the luggage of passengers travelling on a Danube Wings airline flight from Poprad to Dublin, Ireland. The dogs succeeded in finding both pieces, but the policeman accidentally left one of them, a package containing 95g of the substance, among the luggage. When he realised his mistake, he notified the airport administration but not his superiors, whom he informed only on 4 January 2010.

On 3 August 2012 during the construction works the Mi-8 helicopter of TECHMONT company flew several times to Chata pod Rysami mountain hut, located at 2250 meters over the sea. When the goods were offloaded there (carried on the rope under the helicopter), during the steep descent through the valley the free end of the rope hit the tail rotor blades, causing damage to it. The crew was able to fly the chopper to Poprad airport, but on approach controlling the helicopter became more and more difficult until it crash-landed within the airport perimeter and rolled to its side with main rotor and tail section destructed. Two from three members onboard received minor injuries.

On 26 May 2021, after the landing of a Aerospool WT-9 Dynamic, the nose wheel collapsed, the pilot escaped unhurt.
