= Kilkenomics Festival =

Economics event in Kilkenny, Ireland

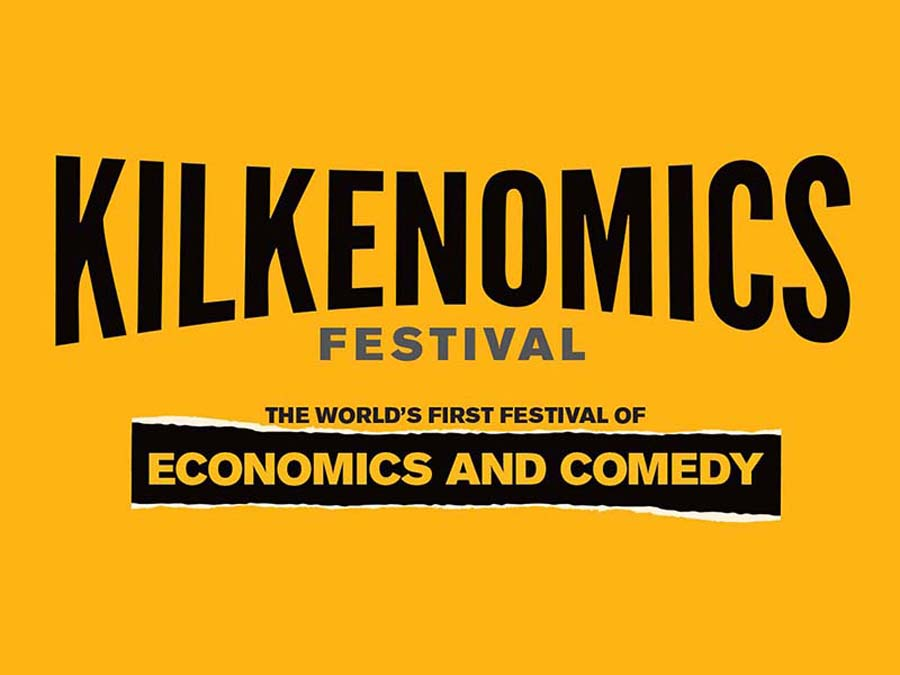
- Wordmark/banner of the festival in 2018
- Genre: Economics and performing arts festival
- Frequency: Annually
- Location: Kilkenny
- Years active: 11 November 2010 – present
- Inaugurated: 11 November 2010; 15 years ago
- Founder: David McWilliams, Richard Cook
- Website: www.kilkenomics.com

The Kilkenomics Comedy and Economic Festival is an economics and comedy festival in Kilkenny, Ireland, the brainchild of David McWilliams and Richard Cook. It grew out of the Cat Laughs festival founded in 1994.

Its first session ran from 11 to 14 November 2010. The festival mocks banking and political figures. The festival also features its own currency known as "the marble".

== See also ==
- Cat Laughs
