= Crosaire =

Pseudonymous Irish crossword compiler (1917–2010)

- Born: John Derek Crozier; 12 November 1917; Dublin, Ireland
- Died: 3 April 2010 (aged 92); Nyanga, Zimbabwe
- Occupation: Crossword compiler

John Derek Crozier (12 November 1917 – 3 April 2010), under the pseudonym "Crosaire" (Irish pronunciation: ['kɾˠɔsəɾʲə]), was the compiler of the cryptic crossword in The Irish Times from its inception in 1943 until the year after his death. It was formally named "The Irish Times Crossword", as opposed to the non-cryptic "Simplex crossword" which was published alongside it from 1951. As Crozier was the sole cryptic compiler for 68 years, the crossword itself became known as "the Crosaire" by metonymy. The pseudonym "Crosaire" is a play on his own surname and crosaire, the Irish for "crossroad". (Note: The Irish for "crossword" is the calque crosfhocal.) After Crozier's death, The Irish Times formally renamed its cryptic crossword in his honour.

== Biography ==
Crozier was born in Dublin and educated at Castle Park preparatory school in Dalkey and Repton School in England. He graduated from Trinity College Dublin in 1940. He worked in administration at the Guinness Brewery in St. James's Gate. He first compiled a crossword to amuse his wife, Marjorie, who remained much better at solving them than her husband. Soon after, he was introduced by Jack White to Irish Times editor Bertie Smyllie at the paper's 1942 Christmas party in a Dublin pub, where he claimed that compiling crosswords was a longstanding hobby and persuaded Smyllie to commission some, the first printed on 13 March 1943. Initially the Crosaire appeared weekly on Saturdays, with Wednesdays added in 1950, Tuesdays in 1955, and a daily puzzle from 1982.

In 1948 Crozier emigrated to Southern Rhodesia, now Zimbabwe, to work as a tobacco and maize farmer in Sinoia, now Chinhoyi. He found farming difficult and the meagre income from his puzzles was important. In the 1962 Southern Rhodesian general election, he stood for the United Federal Party in the Gwebi constituency, losing to Rhodesian Front candidate James Graham, 7th Duke of Montrose. From 1963 to 1989, he taught at St. George's College in Salisbury, now Harare. His puzzles were often delivered to Ireland through visitors from abroad to avoid the vagaries of the Zimbabwe postal system. The backlog of puzzles submitted but not yet published had grown to over a year's worth by his death. He travelled to Dublin in 1993 for the 50th anniversary of his first puzzle, during which he appeared on The Late Late Show and at a forum for 400 fans chosen by lottery. He died at his home in Nyanga, aged 92. A memorial service was held at St. George's College, attended by his three sons.

== Crosaire under Crozier and his successors ==
Until about 1988, Marjorie made the grid and Crozier only created the clues. Subsequently, Crozier took three to four hours to compile a puzzle. He retained an idiosyncratic approach to clues, which never came to conform to emerging British standards synopsised by "Ximenes". Crozier's daily puzzles recycled a small number of 15×15 grid patterns, each with fourfold rotational symmetry. The Simplex crossword used four of the same grids, excluding the Saturday Crosaire grid, which had 13-letter answers on the four edges and, latterly, a theme connecting these four.

Crozier's final puzzle, number 14,605 of 22 October 2011, was the first to be analysed on The Irish Times' new Crosaire blog. Roy Earle, using the pseudonym "Mac An Iarla", compiled the Crosaire from 24 October 2011 to 9 June 2012.

Earle was succeeded by Paul O'Doherty, pseudonym "Crossheir", who compiled the crossword for a 10-year stint that ended on 30 April 2022. O'Doherty was succeeded by a pair of alternating setters: Tony Davis (pseudonym "Dominic") and Niamh O'Connor (pseudonym "Le Corsaire"). Aifric Gallagher (pseudonym "Fidelia") joined the roster of setters on 30 March 2024.

== Bibliography ==
The following anthologies have been published:

- Crozier, Derek (1993). The Crosaire Crossword Challenge. Dublin: O'Brien Press in association with Irish Times Books. ISBN 0862783437.
- Crozier, Derek (31 March 1996). The Crosaire Crossword Challenge 2. O'Brien Press. ISBN 978-0-86278-441-6.
- Crozier, Derek (2004). Crosaire: 120 Crosswords from The Irish Times. O'Brien Press in association with Irish Times Books. ISBN 9780862789008.
- Crozier, Derek (15 August 2009). Crosaire: 120 Crosswords from The Irish Times (new ed.). O'Brien Press in association with Irish Times Books. ISBN 978-1-84717-183-2.

== Sources ==
- Byrne, Gay; Crozier, Derek (12 March 1993). "Interview". The Late Late Show. Raidio Teilifís Éireann. RTÉ One.
