= Dan McCrudden =

American soccer player

Personal information
- Full name: Daniel J. McCrudden
- Date of birth: December 25, 1955 (age 70)
- Place of birth: Queens, New York, U.S.
- Position: Forward

Youth career
- 1974–1977: Rhode Island University

Senior career*
| Years | Team | Apps | (Gls) |
| 1978 | Chicago Sting | 13 | (0) |
- New York Apollo
- * Club domestic league appearances and goals

Dan McCrudden is an American retired soccer forward who played in the North American Soccer League and American Soccer League.

McCrudden attended Rhode Island University where he played on the soccer team from 1974 to 1977. He led the team in scoring all four seasons and was a 1977 Honorable Mention (third team) All American. In 1998, he was inducted into the Rams Hall of Fame. In 1978, the Chicago Sting selected McCrudden in the first round (16th overall) of the North American Soccer League draft. He played one season with the sting, and another five seasons in the American Soccer League where he was a 1980 All Star.

== Current career ==
Dan McCrudden is currently employed as the Senior Director of Facilities Administration at the Northwestern University Kellogg School of Management.
