= Ger Doyle =

Irish swimming coach

- Died: May 29th 2020; Wexford
- Occupation: Swimming coach
- Status: Released Summer 2015
- Criminal charges: 34 counts of indecent assault, one count of sexual assault
- Penalty: 6½ years in prison

Ger Doyle (died 29 May 2020) was an Irish former national swimming coach from Wexford, County Wexford.

Doyle was coach of the Irish Olympic team at the 2000 and 2004 games. He managed New Ross swimming pool for more than two decades.

In 2010 he was jailed for six and a half years after being found guilty in court of 34 counts of indecent assault and one count of sexual assault against underage boys in his care. The abuse took place over a twelve-year period between 1981 and 1993.

== Coaching ==
Doyle managed New Ross swimming pool for 26 years, taking over the role when he was aged 19 in 1980. He became Leinster's swimming coach in 1984 and national swimming coach in 1992 where he remained until 2005. He coached at least one Olympic swimmer. His swimmers broke more than one hundred national records at junior and senior level. He was coach of the Irish Olympic team at the 2000 and 2004 games, though was not well enough to travel to the former. He was Wexford Person of the Year 2004.

== Child abuse ==
In 2005 reports of misconduct began to emerge.

Doyle's trial lasted for six days.

In 2010, Doyle was convicted of 35 counts of indecent and sexual assault on five children aged between ten and fifteen over a period of twelve years between 1981 and 1993. He received a 6 1/2-year prison sentence. The judge described "a complete absence of insight or remorse". There was applause in court as Doyle was led away and survivors of other swimming abuses welcomed the sentence.

One incident described Doyle as having removed a boy's trousers to smack his bottom and touch him. Another child suffered from bouts of anger and another had regular panic attacks. The abuse took place in his office in New Ross. Only one of the five was in court for Doyle's sentencing. Doyle maintained his innocence.

He was the second Olympic swimming coach convicted of such crimes in Ireland, following Derry O'Rourke. George Gibney was charged but not convicted. The Irish Times criticised the sport as a whole for inadequately protecting children, noting that Doyle was allowed to share a hotel room with an 18-year-old male swimmer in 2002 during the British Youth Championships in Sheffield, even though the rules did not permit Michelle Smith to share a room with her fiancé and future husband Erik de Bruin. Doyle attended a child welfare course operated by the Irish Sports Council in 2004, at which time no criticisms were raised.

== Personal life ==
Both Doyle's parents are dead. He resided with his sister in Wexford prior to being convicted of sexual assault. He did not have a criminal record prior to this.
