= Tony Dixon (DJ) =

Irish DJ and blogger

- Born: 1958
- Died: 25 November 2010 (aged 52)
- Presenting career
- Station: FM104
- Time slot: Saturday nights
- Style: Hip hop, R&B
- Country: Dublin

Tony Dixon (1958 – 25 November 2010) was an Irish disc jockey, blogger and a member of the "Northside mafia". He specialised in the hip hop and R&B genres.

Dixon grew up in Pinewood on Dublin's Northside. He was associated with Ian Dempsey, Tony Fenton and Gerry Ryan. He was part of the "Big D" station during the 1970s and Sunshine Radio during the 1980s. Then he managed a nightclub called "Hollywood Nights" which occurred at the Stillorgan Park Hotel.

In February 2000, Dixon became part of FM104, presenting a show on Saturday nights and possessing his own catchphrase, "If it's Hip Hop and RnB, don't miss me, Tony D". While at FM104 he brought artists such as Mary J. Blige, Puff Daddy and Destiny's Child to the attention of the Dublin public. Blues & Soul magazine named him as one of the UK's Top 5 DJs. He blogged regularly.

Dixon died in November 2010 at the age of 52 following a brief illness.
