= West Jewellers =

Former jewellery store in Dublin, Ireland

Coordinates: 53.34303°N 6.25979°W

West of Grafton Street Ltd.
- Industry: Jewellery
- Founded: Capel Street, Dublin (1720)
- Headquarters: Grafton Street, Dublin, Ireland

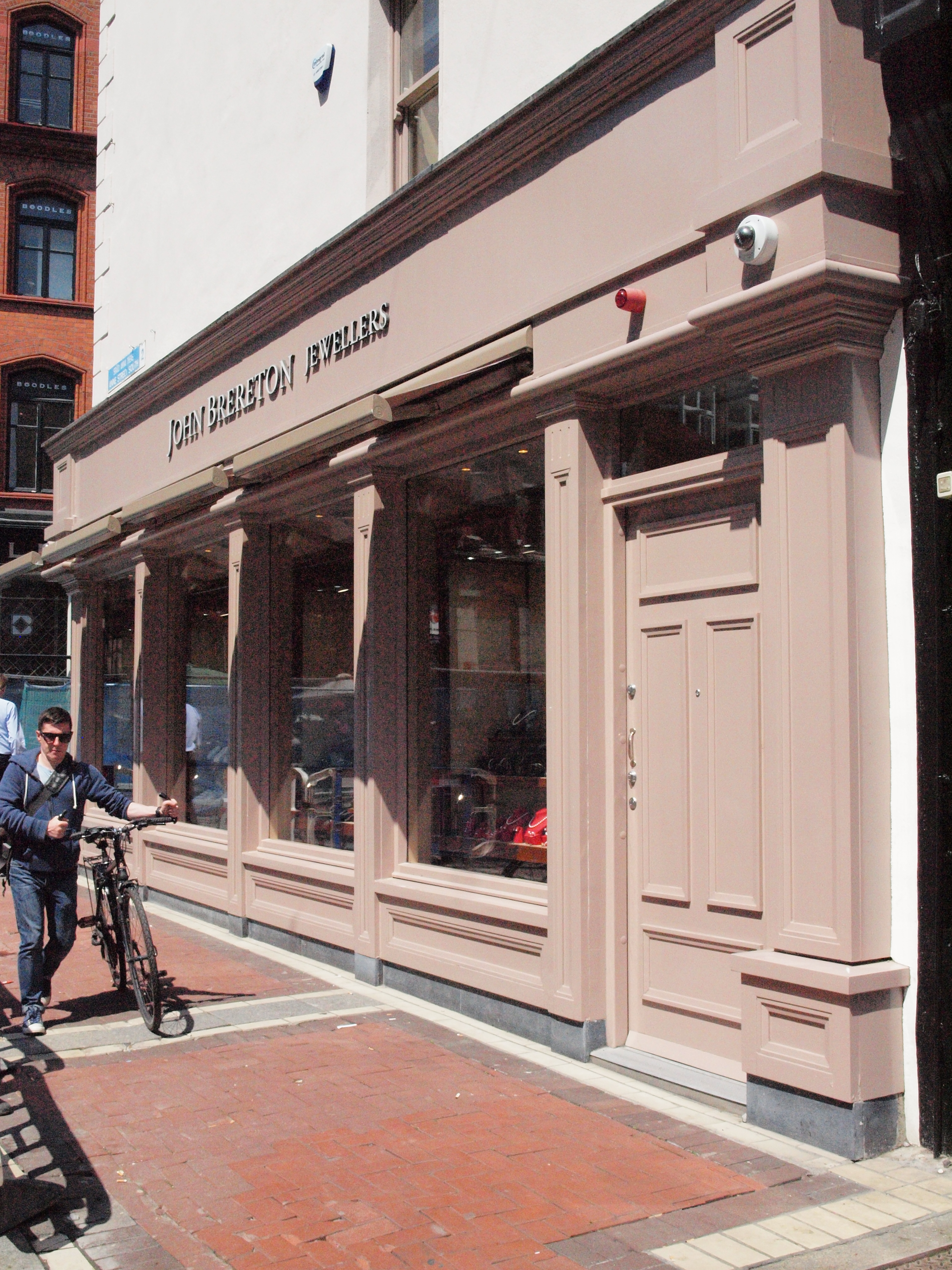
John Brereton Jewellers in the former premises of West Jewellers

West of Grafton Street Ltd. or West Jewellers was a jewellery store which was last located on 33 Grafton Street in Dublin, Ireland before it closed in 2010. It was considered the oldest European jewellery store and one of the oldest companies in Ireland.

== History ==
West began its existence in 1720 as West Sons on the city's Capel Street. It transferred to College Green in 1845 (1841?) and to 102 Grafton Street in 1912. Queen Victoria gave West the royal warrant as her watchmaker, and once bought two replicas of the Tara Brooch from the company. The Lord Lieutenant of Ireland was another customer. The company also created the original 22-carat gold chain of office used by the Lord Mayor of Dublin and one replica. West moved to 33 Grafton Street in 1965. Kathleen Watkins, the wife of veteran broadcaster Gay Byrne, confessed in an interview with The Irish Times that she did not own any jewellery from West.

West closed on 13 February 2010 after hosting a closing-down sale. In its final week of existence staff said they had not been informed of a definite date of closure. Three jobs were lost due to the closure. Joe Moran was in control of the company at the time, while Geraldine L'Estrange West had a minority share. Robert Halpin, manager of West with 46 years experience at its closure, said as it followed several other stores in ceasing to exist: "We are a dinosaur. Grafton Street just doesn't attract our type of clientele anymore. Our customers were the discreetly wealthy and they are gone now". Bigger businesses, such as Boodles, Cartier SA and Tiffany & Co., had opened outlets nearby in the years before West's closure.

The British Royal Collection has two brooches that Prince Albert bought for Queen Victoria from "West & Son" on a visit to Dublin in 1849, presenting them in November and as a Christmas present that year, which were apparently already being made in editions: "...such beautiful souvenirs, both made after those very curious old Irish ornaments we saw in the College in Dublin, one a silver shawl brooch, in smaller size than the original" was her reaction to the November gift.

== See also ==
- Photograph of West & Son Grafton Street storefront in 1913.
- West & Son history including silver hallmarks and advertisements.
