= Danube Wings =

Slovakian regional airline

IATA	ICAO	Call sign
V5	VPA	VIP TAXI
- Founded: 2000, as Vip Wings, a.s.
- Ceased operations: 2013
- Operating bases: M. R. Štefánik Airport
- Headquarters: Bratislava, Slovakia

Danube Wings, trading as VIP Wings, a.s., was a Slovakia-based airline that ceased operations in 2013. Danube Wings had operated regional scheduled services on domestic and international routes using ATR 72 aircraft. Its home base was M. R. Štefánik Airport in Bratislava. VIP Wings, a privately owned Slovak company, was the holder of the licences and the AOC.

== History ==
VIP Wings was established on 23 May 2000, and was created from VIP Air, the first private aviation company in Slovakia.

In August 2008 operations started with ATR 72 aircraft, offering regular transport to the general public. On November 13, 2008, the company was assigned the V5 IATA code. On July 15, 2009, Danube Wings became a member of the European Regional Airlines Association.

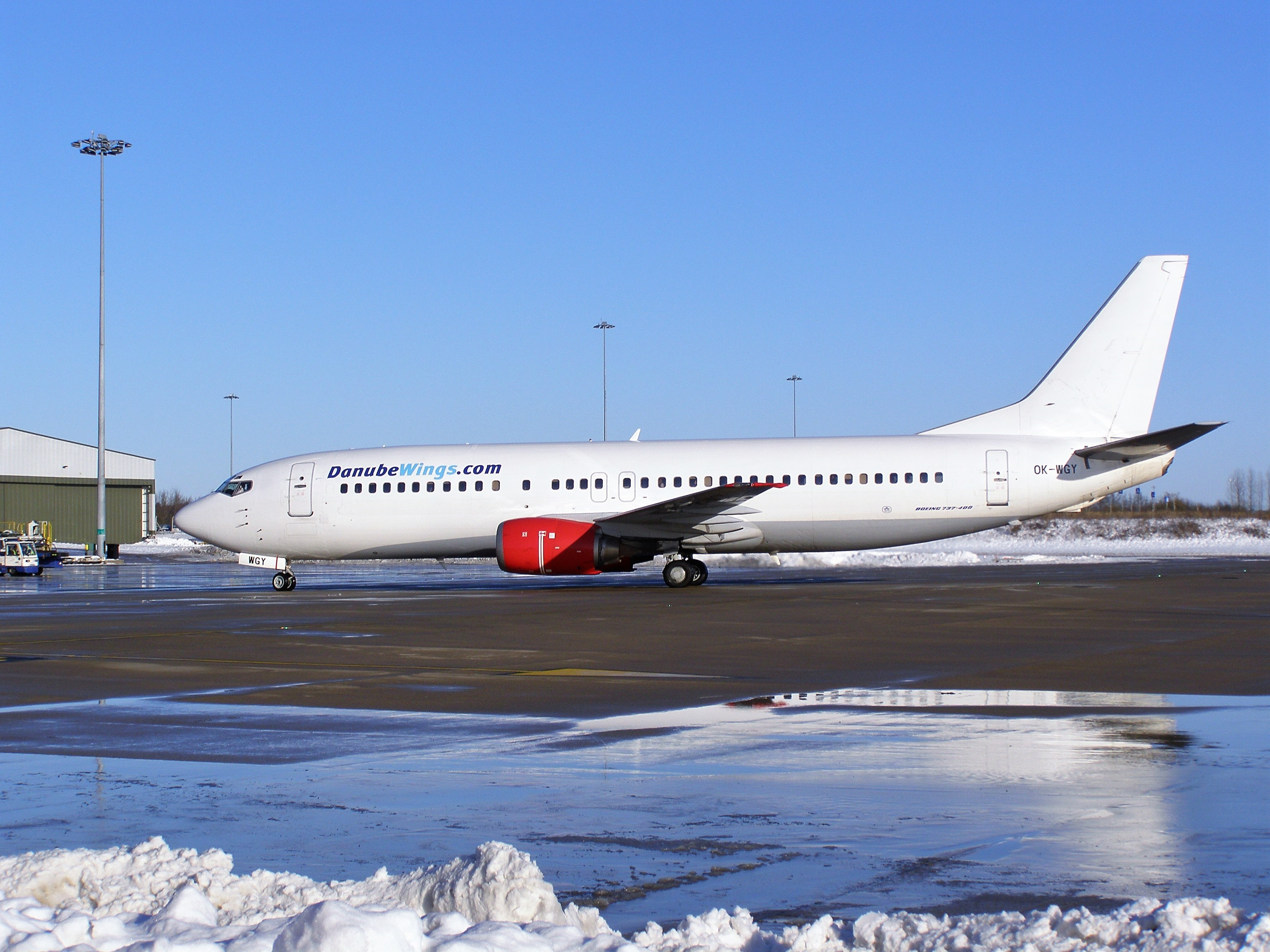

Danube Wings briefly operated a scheduled service from Tatry-Poprad to London/Luton commencing in December 2009. This operated on Tuesdays, Thursdays and Sundays with an ex-British Airways Boeing 737-400 leased from CSA Czech Airlines. This operation was short-lived, and all London flights had stopped by the end of February 2010. The aircraft was returned to CSA in March 2010.

The company faced serious economical problems and on 20 November 2013 ceased all operations on scheduled flights. According to news reports it ceased operations in December 2013 and laid off all employees.

== Business trends ==
The key trends for Danube Wings were as shown below (although, because it was a private company, few figures were publicly available). Figures as at year ending 31 December:

	2008	2009	2010	2011	2012
Turnover (€m)					
Profits (€m)					
Number of employees (at year end)	120				
Number of passengers (k)	4.6	77.8	86.9	74.2	122.8
Passenger load factor (%)	n/a	n/a	n/a	n/a	n/a
Number of aircraft (at year end)	3	4	3	3	4
Notes/sources					

== Destinations ==
Seasonal services to and from destinations in France were cancelled as of January 2013. On October 19, 2013 Danube Wings announced the immediate cancellation of its last remaining schedule route.

== Fleet ==
The Danube Wings fleet included the following aircraft (at January 2013) in an all-economy class:

Danube Wings fleet
Aircraft	In Fleet	Orders	Passengers	Notes
ATR 72-202	4	-	66	One leased to Nextjet for the Gällivare to Arlanda service
Total	4	-		

=== Retired fleet ===
- 1 Boeing 737-400 (leased from Czech Airlines)

== Incidents and accidents ==
- On 2 January 2010, Danube Wings Flight 8230, a Boeing 737-400, was involved in an incident when Slovak Police hid 8 explosives in passengers' luggage to test the airport's security systems. In error, one of the explosives was not removed afterwards, and was later flown to Dublin, causing an international incident.
