= European Transport Safety Council =

ETSC
- European Transport Safety Council
- Abbreviation: ETSC
- Formation: 1993; 33 years ago
- Type: Nonprofit non-governmental organization
- Location: Brussels, Belgium
- Region served: Europe
- Services: Advocate for vehicle and road safety standards, promote legislation, research
- Fields: Road safety
- Official language: English
- President: Walter Eichendorf
- Executive Director: Antonio Avenoso
- Website: www.etsc.eu

The European Transport Safety Council (ETSC) is a non-profit organisation that works to reduce the number of deaths and injuries in traffic collisions that occur in Europe. It publishes an annual Road Safety Performance Index Report, measuring progress in reducing road deaths in Europe.

One of the ETSC's main work areas is vehicle safety standards in Europe. The organisation was one of the expert organisations that advocated for updates to the European Union's General Safety Regulation, which requires, among other technologies, Automated Emergency Braking, Intelligent Speed Assistance and Lane Departure Warning systems to be fitted on all new vehicles sold in Europe from July 2022.
