= VenueOne =

VenueOne logo

VenueOne Entertainment Limited was founded in 2010 by entrepreneur Stephen Byrne and experienced venture capitalist Neil O’Leary, of Ion Equity, who has invested in VenueOne in a private capacity. The start-up has partnered with Trinity College, Dublin to run a project of synchronisation of live video over the internet.

Stephen is an experienced IT entrepreneur. In 1985, Stephen co-founded InsuranceLink - the fraud insurance detection solution in Ireland which has recently been re branded as Risk Intelligence Ireland. Stephen founded MoneyMate in 1989 and in 2004 moved from his position of Managing Director to the MoneyMate Board of Directors. Stephen then founded Midelin Investments Limited, a boutique private equity company focusing on property development. In 2010, Stephen moved back into IT and founded VenueOne an online entertainment business where he is currently CEO.

The objective is to build an online global venue that's no different from The O2 Arena or Madison Square Garden. It behaves a little like The O2 Arena, in that it will give them access to live gigs and interactive online engagements with bands. The website, venueone.com, has been in beta testing since November 2011, and to date has live-streamed a number of gigs, such as Sinéad O'Connor performing at the Barretstown Inspirations show at Dublin's Olympia Theatre, the South By Southwest music festival in Texas, and the Meteor Choice Music Prize. Users can create their own YouTube party, search YouTube, create playlists and invite friends from Facebook, Twitter, or share the ‘YouTube Party’ link any other way. Once signed into VenueOne.com they can all chat online.

VenueOne was shortlisted for an ITLG Irish Times Innovation Award in March 2012.
