= Donegal County Museum =

- Músaem Chontae Dhún na nGall
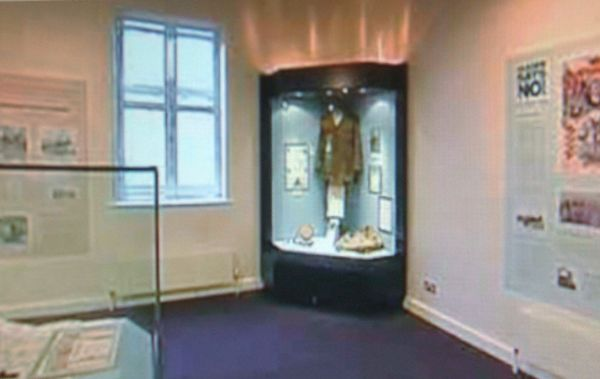
- Displays within Donegal County Museum

- Location within Ireland
- Established: 1987
- Location: Letterkenny, County Donegal, Ireland
- Coordinates: 54.9546°N 7.7349°W
- Type: County museum

Donegal County Museum (Irish: Músaem Chontae Dhún na nGall) is a county museum in County Donegal in Ireland. Located on the High Road in Letterkenny, the museum building was completed in 1843 as the Warden's House of the Letterkenny Workhouse. The building was repurposed as a museum in the late 20th century.

== History ==
The museum was originally housed in what was once the warden's house of the Letterkenny Workhouse. The workhouse was designed by George Wilkinson, built at a cost of £5,785 and £910 for fixtures and fittings, and was completed in May 1843.

The Donegal County Museum first opened to the public in 1987. It received additional European Union funding in 1989.

The museum was extended and officially re-opened by President Mary Robinson on 14 June 1992.

Parts of the museum, including an old staircase, were discovered to have dry rot in the 1990s. The museum was closed, while these issues were addressed, and it reopened in 1999.

As of July 2024, the museum's collection was overseen by the "longest serving museum curator in Ireland". The curator, Judith McCarthy, took up the position in July 1994. She attended school in Cootehill, County Cavan, before attending Trinity and obtaining a Diploma in Arts Administration from University College Dublin.

== Collection ==
The purpose of Donegal County Museum is to "collect, record, preserve, and display the material evidence and associated information of the History and Heritage of County Donegal". In 2013, the then Minister for Arts, Heritage and the Gaeltacht, Jimmy Deenihan, said that the museum was among the "best in Ireland" at "dealing with the past and recognising all traditions [and diversity]".

Donegal County Museum is a "Designated Museum" which, under the National Monuments (Amendment) Act, 1994, and the National Cultural Institutions Act, 1997, is entitled to retain objects on behalf of the state.

== Exhibitions ==
The museum exhibited the Bronze Aged Tullydonnell gold rings, dating from 1200 to 800 B.C., shortly after their chance discovery in June 2018. They were subsequently moved to the National Museum of Ireland.

In November 2022, the museum launched a database of Donegal people who died in World War I (WWI). The museum staged its first exhibition on WWI in 2001, and had another in 2014.
