= William Murphy (bishop of Kerry) =

Irish Catholic bishop

- Bishop Emeritus of Kerry
- Diocese: Kerry
- See: Kerry
- Appointed: 17 June 1995
- Installed: 10 September 1995
- Term ended: 2 May 2013
- Predecessor: Diarmaid O’Súilleabháin
- Successor: Raymond Browne

Orders
- Ordination: 18 June 1961
- Consecration: 10 September 1995 by Dermot Clifford

Personal details
- Born: 6 June 1936 (age 90) Annaghmore, Ireland
- Denomination: Roman Catholic

Styles of William Murphy
- Reference style: The Right Reverend
- Spoken style: My Lord
- Religious style: Bishop
- Posthumous style: none

William Murphy (born 6 June 1936), ordained as a priest in 1961, is a retired Roman Catholic bishop of Kerry.

== Life ==
Murphy was born in Annaghmore, County Kerry, Ireland. He received his education at Ratheen National School and St Brendan's College, Killarney. He studied for the priesthood at St Patrick's College, Maynooth, and was ordained a priest in 1961.

For six years, Murphy taught at St Colman's College, Newry. He then went on to study catechetics at Lumen Vitae, Brussels, and Fordham University, New York, where he earned an MA in religious education in 1969. He was Kerry diocesan advisor for religious education in primary schools in 1970, and then spent three years at the Pontifical Gregorian University, Rome, earning a doctorate in divinity (DD) in 1973.

For the next five years he worked with the Primary Catechetical Commission preparing the Children of God series, the primary catechetical program.

Murphy taught theology in the Institute for Religious Education, Mount Oliver, Dundalk, for a year before returning to Kerry in 1979 as diocesan director of religious education in post-primary schools and co-ordinator of adult religious education in the diocese.

He was the first director of the John Paul II Pastoral Centre, Killarney, becoming Curate of Killarney Parish in 1987 and administrator in 1988. Upon the death of Bishop Diarmaid O’Súilleabháin in August 1994 he was appointed administrator of the diocese of Kerry, and was elevated to bishop in 1995.
