= Niall McCrudden =

Irish music promoter (died 2010)

- Died: 20 February 2010; Drumcondra, Dublin
- Occupation: Optician
- Known for: Optician to Ireland's celebrities
- Children: One son

Niall McCrudden was a music manager, promoter, celebrity optician and socialite. He was co-founder of Insight, one of Ireland's foremost optician chains. He became known as the "optician to the stars" after selling a pair of sunglasses to Jim Corr.

== Career ==
McCrudden initially worked for McNally Opticians for two years. Insight was founded by McCrudden and partner Graham Smithers in 1992, with its first practice located on top of a doctor on the Swords Road. He was considered the "unofficial optician to Ireland's trendy eyeware-sporting celebrities". They later located to Clane, Inchicore and Rathcoole for a time and tested the eyes of students in universities. In 2006 the company was involved in a dispute with Specsavers which used the word "insight" during an advertising campaign. McNally Opticians acquired Insight later that year. McCrudden's had an exhibition titled Stars in their Specs and an optical museum on Talbot Street, Dublin which featured on Mooney in May 2007 when reporter Brenda Donohue paid a visit. He next turned his eye to Sunglasses.ie, a new website he set up in August 2009.

McCrudden was involved in other businesses. He also managed boybands. In 2005 he attended an international polo tournament. He was also reported as having attended other social events, such as important birthday parties. In September 2009 he was one of a team of Irish celebrities who spent a week climbing Machu Picchu in Peru in aid of Autism Action.

== Health ==
He endured depression and had spent time receiving treatment in hospital. He discharged himself and was found dead in his Drumcondra home at the age of 45 on the evening of 20 February 2010. He was survived by his son, his parents, his twin brother and his sister.

Many of Ireland's celebrities, including models, former Miss World Rosanna Davison, musicians, Eurovision Song Contest winners, television personalities, snooker players and the Lord Mayor of Dublin, attended McCrudden's funeral at the Corpus Christi Church in Griffith Avenue, Dublin on 24 February 2010. Boyzone member Keith Duffy was one of those who helped carry the coffin. Fellow Boyzone member and friend Mikey Graham tweeted his dismay at the news – "Very sad today. Lost a very close pal on Saturday and just found out before I went on ice. So damn tough, another friend gone. RIP pal." – he was unable to attend the funeral as he was in London rehearsing for a television show. Boyzone had known McCrudden since 1993.
