= St Mary's Cathedral, Killarney =

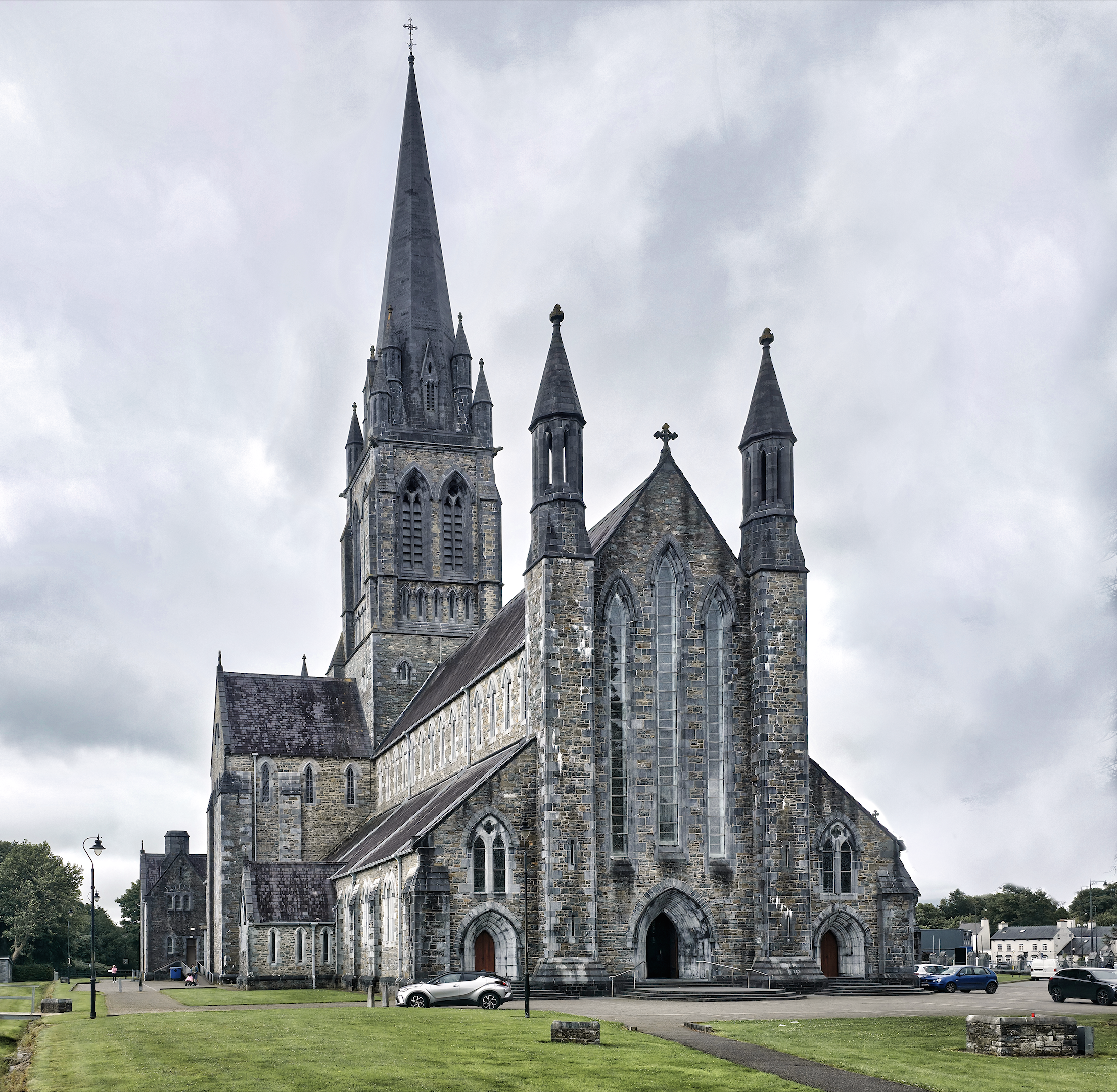

- Location in Ireland
- 52.0586°N 9.5174°W
- Location: New Street, Killarney, County Kerry, Ireland
- Denomination: Catholic Church
- Website: https://www.killarneyparish.com/

History
- Status: Cathedral
- Consecrated: 1855

Architecture
- Style: Gothic Revival
- Years built: 1842–1855
- Completed: 1855

Specifications
- Materials: Limestone

Administration
- Province: Cashel and Emly
- Diocese: Kerry
- Parish: Cathedral

Clergy
- Bishop: Raymond Browne

St. Mary's Cathedral, Killarney, is the cathedral church of the Diocese of Kerry situated to the west of Killarney in County Kerry, Ireland.

== Architecture ==
St. Mary's Cathedral was designed by the renowned English architect Augustus Welby Pugin, who is said to have gained inspiration from the ruins of Ardfert Cathedral "which is particularly evident in the slender triple lancets in the east and west walls".

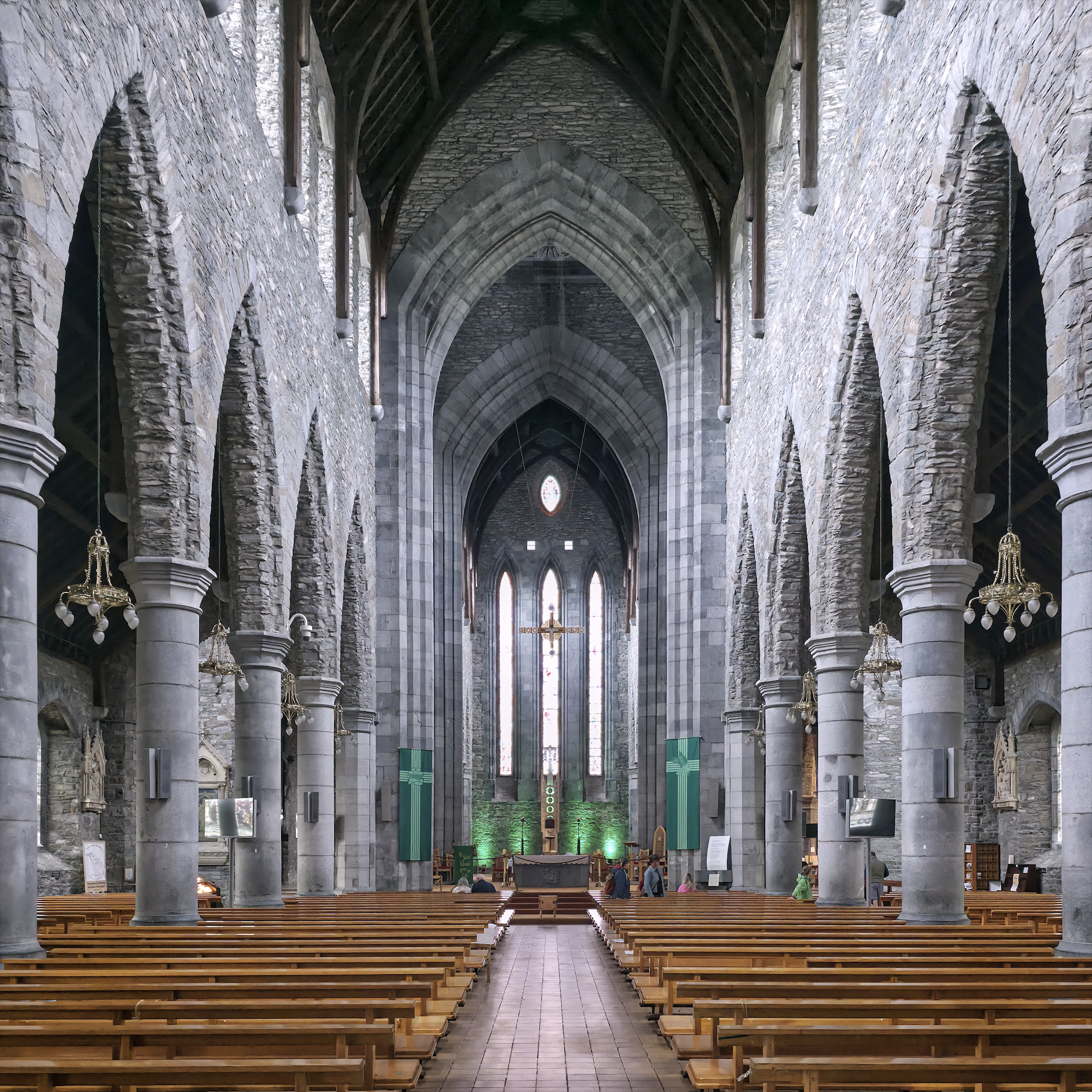
St. Mary's Cathedral Nave

Construction began in 1842 but was not continuous. The great famine and the lack of available funds meant the work was stopped several times; when work recommenced in 1853, the interior decorations were designed by James Joseph McCarthy. In 1855 the building was ready for regular worship. Separately the spire and nave were completed in 1907 by the Irish architects Ashlin and Coleman of Dublin, who had designed Cobh Cathedral.

The width of the nave was based on the medieval models to be found throughout Ireland and England. The west end is very Irish in character, with three tall lancet windows and a very low entrance door beneath. The stonework used is an attractive mixture of brown and grey stone. The siting of the church is more like the siting of a priory than the siting of a cathedral, as the cathedral stands in a huge field instead of in the middle of the original settlement of Killarney.

In 1973 the cathedral was "reordered" under the direction of Bishop Eamonn Casey. Many of the original interior features were removed or damaged and this renovation is regarded by some as controversial.

A flavour of the scale of the change envisioned by the architect Ray Carroll is given in this assessment: "the greatest single change was the removal of all the internal Victorian plasterwork. The original reredos, altar and screens were removed, the floor of the crossing was raised to the level of the former sanctuary, and a new sanctuary was created at the crossing. A new altar, pulpit, throne and chairs, all made of Tasmanian oak, were installed."

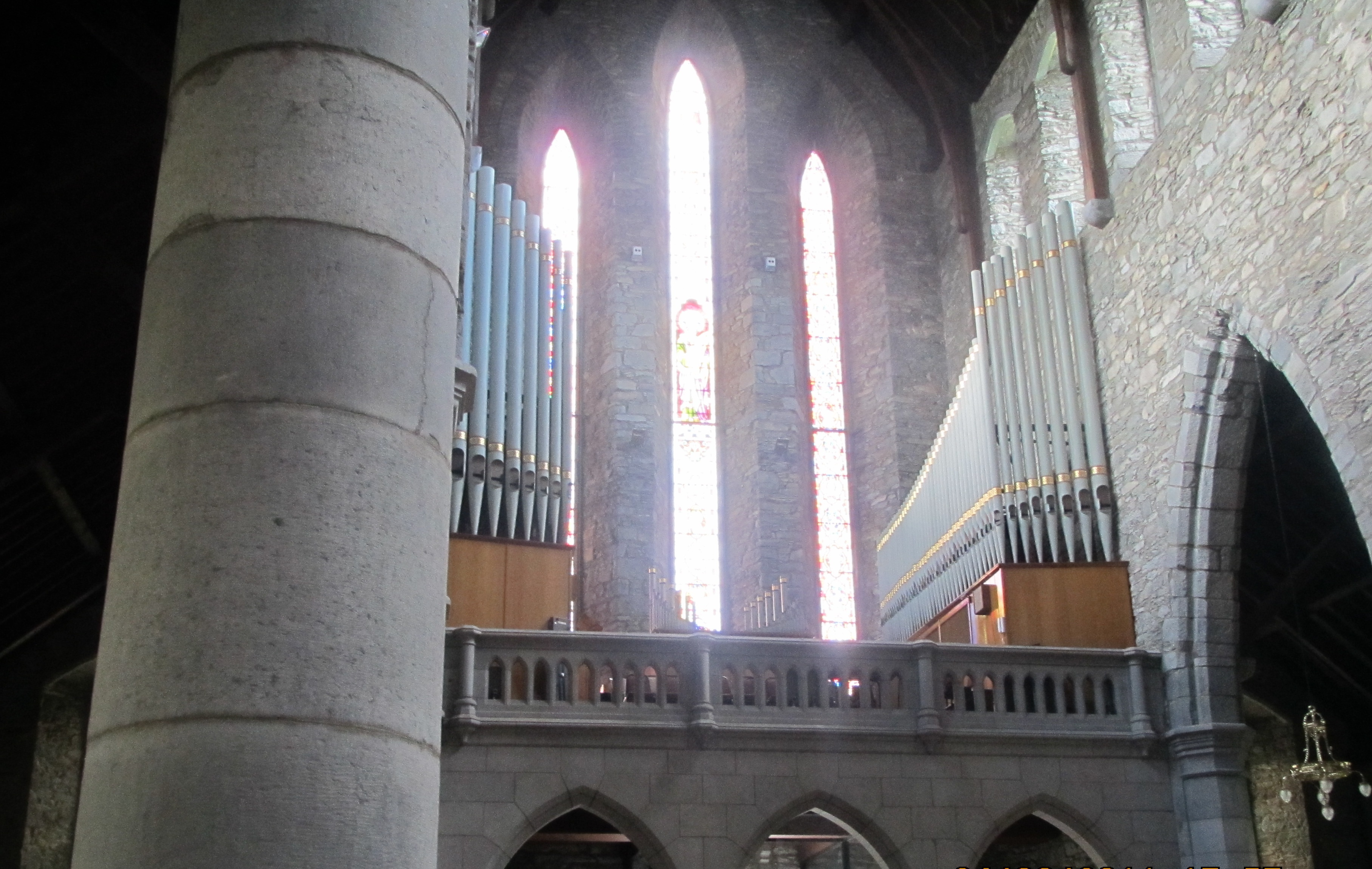
Organ

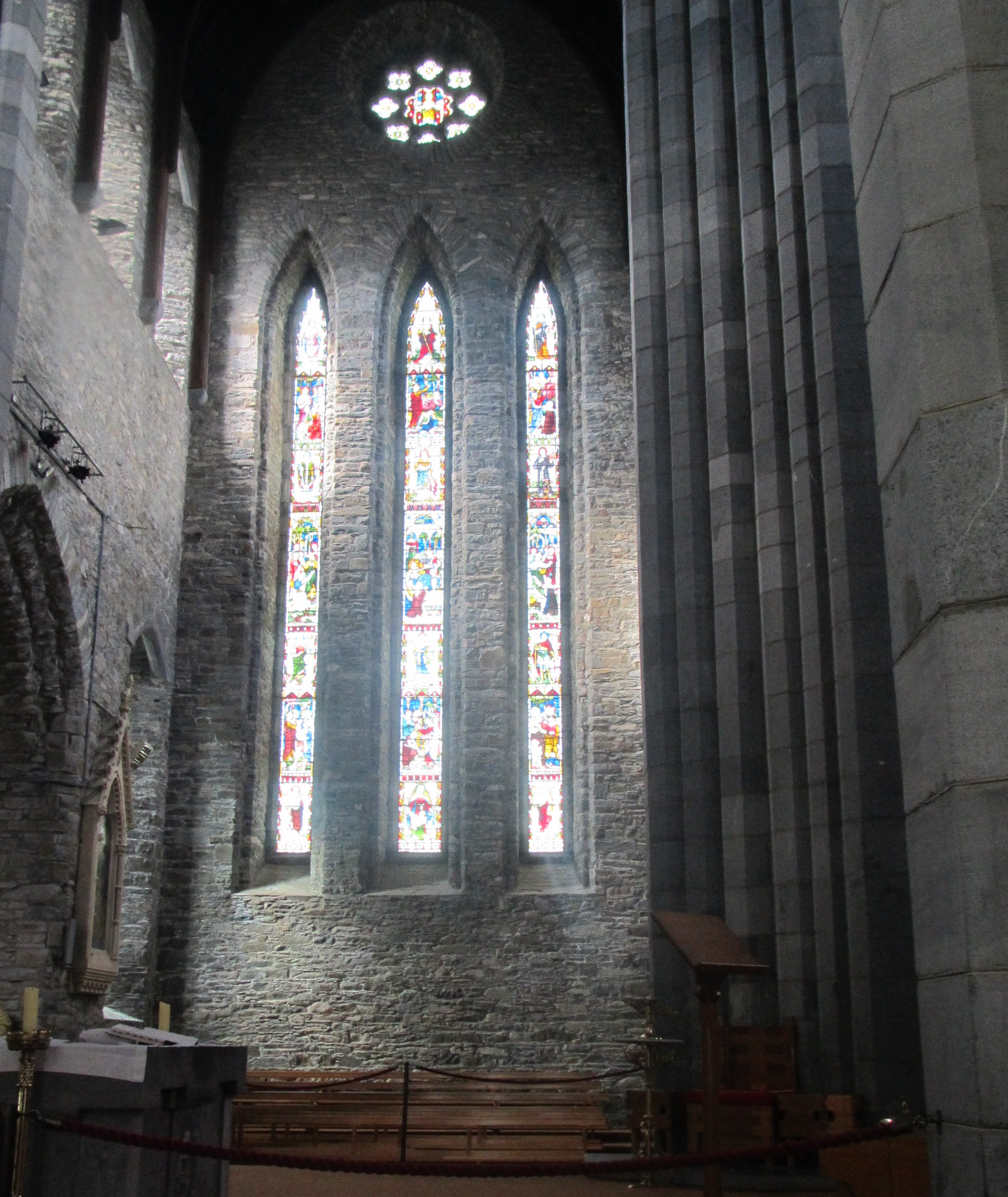
Window

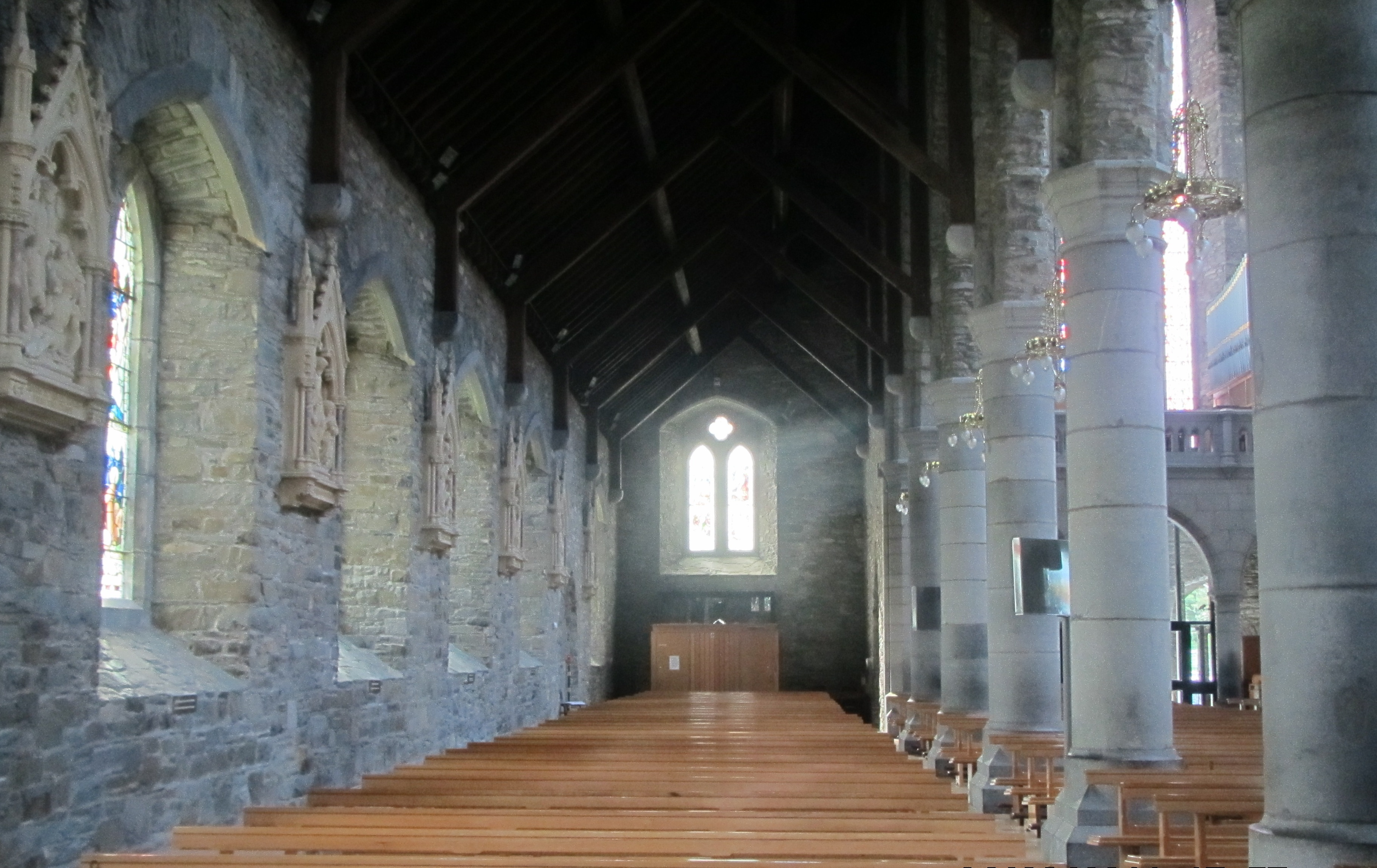
Left chapel

== Bibliography ==
- Peter Galloway, The Cathedrals of Ireland, The Institute of Irish Studies, The Queen's University of Belfast, 1992
