= Liberties Press =

Irish book publisher

- Industry: Books, Publishing
- Founded: 2003
- Founder: Sean O'Keeffe, Peter O'Connell
- Headquarters: 1 Terenure Place, Dublin 6W
- Products: Books
- Website: libertiespress.com

Liberties Press (also known as Liberties Media Ltd) is an independent book publisher based in Dublin, founded in 2003. The company's first publication was Con Houlihan's collection of sportswriting, More Than a Game: the title was reprinted twice in a few weeks. Under the stewardship of founders Peter O'Connell and Seán O’Keeffe, the press initially published only non-fiction titles, many by significant figures in the worlds of politics, journalism and the arts. O'Connell left the company in 2009; following his departure, the press was significantly reorganised, and the focus of the publishing programme was shifted, with more emphasis being placed on fiction and, to a lesser extent, poetry, alongside non-fiction.

Liberties Press hit the headlines in 2012 when it announced plans to publish When We Dance by Melanie Verwoerd. Businessman Dave Kavanagh filed an injunction to prevent the book from being released. Kavanagh alleged that he was defamed in the book: the first half of the book covered Verwoerd's early life in South Africa; the second half dealt with, among other things, her relationship with broadcaster Gerry Ryan. The effort to seek an injunction was withdrawn after the case came before the High Court. The book entered the bestseller lists at no. 2 and went to no. 1 the following week.

Also in 2012, Setting the Truth Free: The Inside Story of the Bloody Sunday Justice Campaign, by Julieann Campbell, was awarded the Christopher Ewart-Biggs Memorial Prize. The prize is awarded every two years to a book, play or piece of journalism which promotes peace and reconciliation in Ireland. Unusually, the book was launched in three cities: Derry, Dublin and (by human rights lawyer Gareth Peirce) London.

In 2014, the publisher expanded its brick and mortar offices to include a bookstore that offered Liberties Press books and other sundries. The press was instrumental in the pop-up bookshops that were run in Dublin city centre in 2014 (South William Street) and 2015 (Drury Street). The dozen participating publishers divided the costs of running each shop, and the proceeds were distributed according to the sales achieved by each company.

In autumn 2016, Liberties Press was criticised for its failure to pay author royalties in a timely fashion, and for its decision to charge a fee to authors who wished to have submissions considered for publication by the press. The fee was subsequently increased. Public comment was made on this issue by, among others, literary agent Jonathan Williams, former Publishing Ireland president Ruth Hegarty, and Michael McLoughlin, publishing director of Penguin Ireland, a subsidiary of US multinational Penguin Random House, who described Liberties Press as "an outlier". The company's decision to increase the fee was commented on by authors John Boyne, Sheila O'Flanagan and Patricia Scanlon. Publisher Seán O'Keeffe was interviewed on this issue by broadcaster and author Sinéad Gleeson for the RTÉ Radio 1 programme The Book Show, alongside Ruth Hegarty. O'Keeffe subsequently complained to RTÉ about the manner in which the interview had been conducted; the interview was not broadcast. O'Keeffe was also interviewed by Marie-Louise Muir on the BBC NI radio programme The Arts Show. The Independent also commented on the matter, drawing attention to the Arts Council funding received by Liberties Press and other publishers. Over the 12 days of Christmas 2016, Liberties Press tweeted details of the Arts Council funding received by book publishers in Ireland (in ascending order of the amount of funding awarded).

Liberties Press was significantly reorganised in 2017 in advance of the changes to the book sector which the directors anticipated in the wake of the UK's impending exit from the European Union. Also in 2017, Edge of Heaven by R. B. Kelly, a debut work of science fiction published by Liberties Press in 2016, was shortlisted for the Kate O'Brien Award, which celebrates new Irish writing by female authors. The book was subsequently removed from the shortlist, at the request of the author.

The company's recent releases include Grange Abbey, the debut novel by property developer David Daly (published under the pseudonym Dave Delaney), which entered the best-seller lists at no. 5 on release; Lead White, the debut novel from Molesworth Gallery owner Ronan Lyons; Quality Time at St Chinian, a comic novel by Patrick Masterson; and Clearing the Hurdles, the autobiography of property developer and racehorse owner Joe McGowan, which entered the best-seller lists at no. 3 in August 2018. in 2015, Liberties published Behind the Mask, an autobiographical memoir written by Patrick Treacy, in which describes his training as a doctor, his travels and becoming dermatologist to Michael Jackson. In September 2018, Caitriona Lally, whose debut novel, Eggshells, was published by Liberties Press in 2015, was awarded the Rooney Prize for Irish Literature, an award made annually to an Irish author under the age of 40. The book was reissued by the Borough Press, an imprint of US multinational HarperCollins, on 20 September 2018.

Liberties Press's planned releases for 2019 include Oh When the Saints, a Dublin Beat novel by US poet Peter Money; The File Note, a debut "cosy crime" novel by David Foley; and a guide for parents on choosing childcare, published in association with Túsla, the state agency for child and adolescent services.

== Authors ==
- Leland Bardwell
- Dr Harry Barry
- John Boyle
- Ciaran Buckley
- Fionnbar Callanan
- Patrick Skene Catling
- Steve Conway
- Tony Corcoran
- Maurice Craig
- Richard Crowley
- Seamus Dowling
- Aidan Dunne
- Jason Dunne
- John Dunne
- Michael Dwyer
- Nick Fairall
- Desmond FitzGerald
- Garret FitzGerald
- Prof. Michael Fitzgerald
- Finbarr Flood
- Noel Gilmore
- Iorwerth Griffiths
- Rory Hafford
- Francis Hagan
- Jack Harte
- Michael D. Higgins
- Con Houlihan
- David Hughes
- Gerry Johnston
- Donna Kennedy
- Mary Kenny
- Ed Leahy
- Sandra Mara
- Orla McHugh
- Fiona McPhillips
- John Montague
- Risteárd Mulcahy
- Gerry Mullins
- John G Murphy
- Lisa O'Callaghan
- Paul O'Doherty
- Niamh O'Sullivan
- Conor Pope
- Seán O Riain
- Elisabeth Schlammerl
- Niall Stanage
- Brody Sweeney
- Egon Theiner
- Yseult Thornley
- Patrick Treacy
- Antoinette Walker
- Chris Ward
- Patrick West
- Phil Young
