= 2005 in Ireland =

- Centuries: 19th; 20th; 21st
- Decades: 1980s; 1990s; 2000s; 2010s; 2020s
- See also: 2005 in Northern Ireland; Other events of 2005; List of years in Ireland

Events from the year 2005 in Ireland.

== Incumbents ==
- President: Mary McAleese
- Taoiseach: Bertie Ahern (FF)
- Tánaiste: Mary Harney (PD)
- Minister for Finance: Brian Cowen (FF)
- Chief Justice: John L. Murray
- Dáil: 29th
- Seanad: 22nd

== Events ==
=== January ===
- 1 January –
  - The Health Service Executive was established along with the HSE National Ambulance Service.
  - Cork officially became the European Capital of Culture for 2005. Ireland celebrated the Hamilton year of physics.
  - Littlepace housing estate in Clonee, County Meath was struck by a small tornado.
- 4 January – Eleven-year-old Robert Holohan went missing from his East Cork home, prompting a nationwide search. His body was found eight days later.
- 6 January – The Irish Farmers Association celebrated its 50th anniversary.
- 8 January – Minister for Foreign Affairs, Dermot Ahern, visited the area of South-East Asia devastated by the recent tsunami.
- 18 January – Taoiseach Bertie Ahern began a trade mission to China, accompanied by one third of the Cabinet including Micheál Martin, Mary Hanafin, Mary Coughlan and Noel Dempsey.
- 20 January – Ireland changed all road signage and regulations to use kilometres per hour (km/h). Distance and speed in Northern Ireland remained in miles per hour.
- 24 January – Former Minister for Justice Ray Burke was jailed for six months for tax evasion, as a result of legislation he introduced. He was the first cabinet minister to be jailed as a result of a tribunal of inquiry.

=== February ===
- 7 February – Taoiseach Bertie Ahern laid the foundation stone of a new town called Adamstown, just outside Lucan, County Dublin.
- 17 February – Seven people were detained by the Garda Síochána for suspected activities in relation to a bank heist in Belfast in December 2004. £2.3 million sterling was seized in County Cork.

=== March ===
- 4 March – The 100th Sinn Féin ardfheis (annual party conference) opened at the Royal Dublin Society in Ballsbridge, Dublin.
- 11 March – The Irish Sugar Company factory in Carlow closed with the loss of several hundred jobs. It was Ireland's oldest sugar factory.
- 27 March – Cian O'Connor was stripped of his Olympic gold medal after the sports ruling body find that his horse, Waterford Crystal, had banned substances in its system during the Olympic Games in 2004.

=== April ===
- 4 April – The Minister for Foreign Affairs, Dermot Ahern, was appointed as one of four special envoys for United Nations reform by the UN Secretary General, Kofi Annan.
- 8 April – President Mary McAleese and Taoiseach Bertie Ahern represented Ireland at the funeral of Pope John Paul II in Rome. A remembrance service was held at the papal cross in the Phoenix Park, Dublin.
- 16 April – The annual congress of the Gaelic Athletic Association voted to allow association football and rugby to be played in Croke Park under certain circumstances.

=== May ===
- 23 May – Five schoolgirls died and many people were injured in a collision between a school bus and two other vehicles in County Meath.

=== June ===
- 13 June – The Irish language was granted official status as a working language within the European Union.
- 30 June – The M50 motorway was finally completed, 34 years after the route was first envisaged and 17 years after construction began.

=== July ===
- 7 July – The Taoiseach met Pope Benedict XVI for a private audience in Rome.
- 16 July – Irish student, Tara Whelan (17), and a British holidaymaker were among five people killed in the Kuşadası minibus bombing in Turkey.
- 18 July – Tallaght Rehabilitation Project, a drug and alcohol addiction rehabilitation programme in the wider Tallaght area, began using Kiltalown House, Jobstown as their headquarters.
- 28 July – The Provisional Irish Republican Army made history by ending its armed campaign and ordering all its units to dump arms. The organisation also ordered its members not to engage in any other activities.
- 29 July – Forty-five-year-old Limerick woman, Dolores McNamara, won €115 million in the EuroMillions rollover jackpot prize. It was Europe's largest ever lottery jackpot.

=== September ===
- 7 September – Ireland lost 1–0 to France in a crucial football World Cup qualifying match.
- 8 September – 'Area Development Management' was officially renamed as Pobal
- 15 September – Ireland reached its highest population since 1861. The increase consisted of the return of Irish people living abroad, and immigrants from Europe and Asia.
- 19 September – Irish Ferries offered voluntary redundancy packages to its 543 seafaring workers.
- 26 September – The head of the Independent International Commission on Decommissioning, General John de Chastelain, said that he is satisfied that the Irish Republican Army has completed the decommissioning of its entire arsenal of weapons.

=== October ===
- 14 October – Roy Keane announced his retirement from international football following Ireland's failure to qualify for World Cup 2006 in Germany.
- 18 October – Tiede Herrema returned to the city of Limerick from which he was kidnapped 30 years ago in a high-profile case. Herrema presented his personal papers relating to the event to the University of Limerick Library.
- 20 October – The abducted journalist Rory Carroll was released unharmed after being kidnapped in Iraq the previous day.
- 25 October – The Ferns Report was published, detailing the investigation into clerical sex abuse in the Roman Catholic Diocese of Ferns.

=== November ===
- 1 November – The Government launched Transport 21, the biggest transport plan in the history of the state. It will allow €34.4 million to be spent on roads, rail, and the Dublin metropolitan area over a ten-year period.
- 18 November –
  - Cork City Football Club won the League of Ireland for the second time in its history.
  - Roy Keane left Manchester United football club in a decision that was said to be by mutual consent.

=== December ===
- 6 December – Irishman Terry Wogan received a knighthood from Elizabeth II in recognition of his services to broadcasting.
- 8 December – President McAleese met Elizabeth II at Hillsborough Castle, County Down, the first time they met in Ireland.

== Arts and literature ==
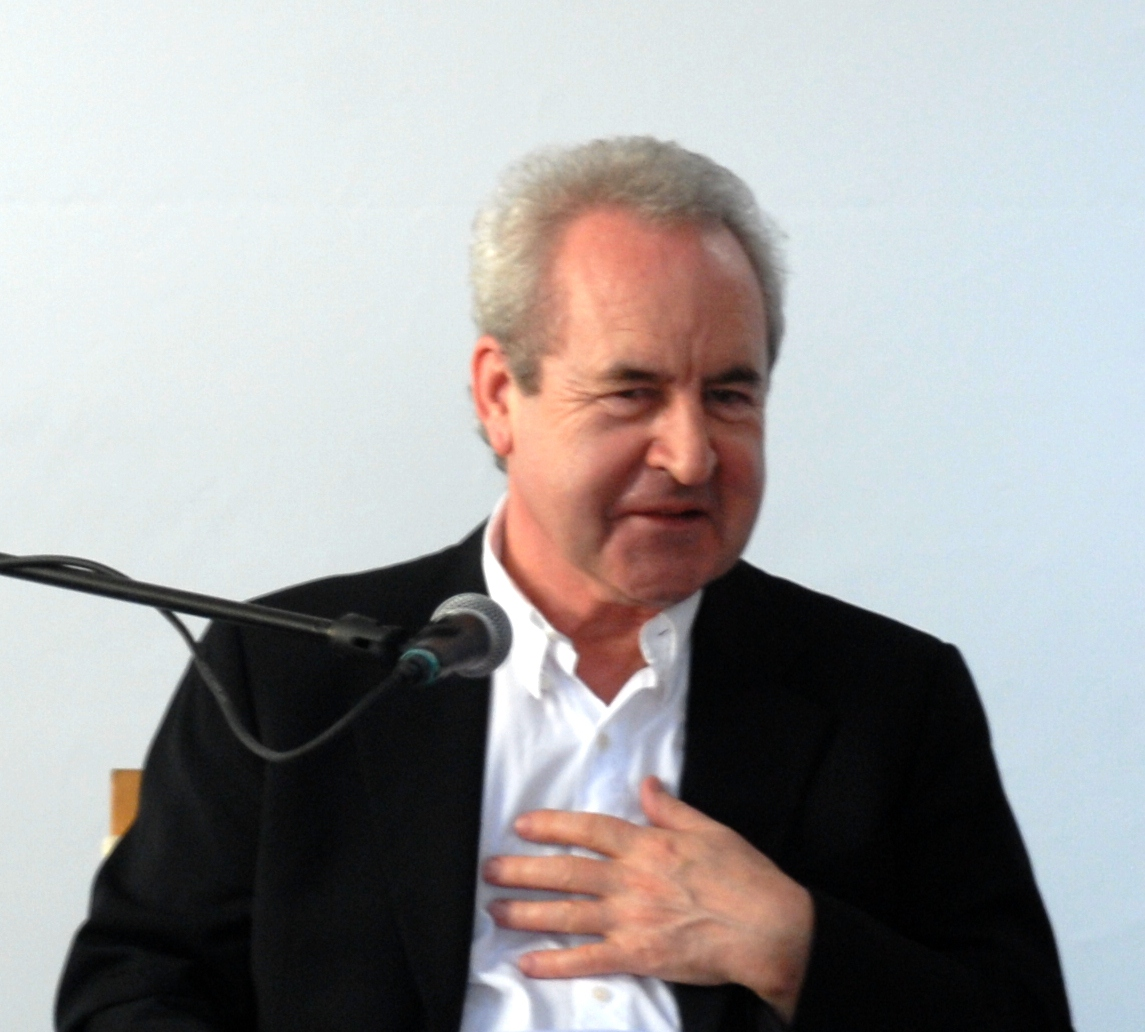
John Banville won the Man Booker Prize, for his novel The Sea.

- Colm Tóibín was awarded the Los Angeles Times Book Award for his novel The Master.
- John Banville won the Man Booker Prize for his novel The Sea.
- Mike McCormack's postmodern science fiction novel Notes from a Coma, set in County Mayo, was published.
- The Academy for Entrepreneurship on Citiwest Business Campus, Dublin, was designed by De Blacam & Meagher.

=== Music ===
- The comedy musical play I, Keano premièred in Dublin.

== Sport ==
=== Association football ===
- World Cup 2006 Qualification
  - Ireland 1–1 Israel
  - Ireland 2–2 Israel
  - Ireland 2–0 Faroe Islands
  - Ireland 0–1 France
  - Ireland 1–0 Cyprus
  - Ireland 0–0 Switzerland

Both Ireland teams failed to qualify

Setanta Cup

- Winners: Linfield

League of Ireland

- Winners: Cork City

Irish League

- Winners: Glentoran

Irish Cup

- Winners: Portadown

FAI Carlsberg Cup

- Drogheda United 2–0 Cork City
- The Irish Football Association celebrated its 125th anniversary.
- The UEFA under-19 European championship was hosted by Ireland, with the final won by France in Windsor Park on 29 July.
- There was an all-Irish clash in the first qualifying round of the UEFA Champions League. Shelbourne defeated Glentoran 6–2 on aggregate. Shelbourne lost in the following round to Steaua București.

=== Gaelic games ===
All-Ireland Senior Hurling Championship Final

- Cork 1–21 : 1–16 Galway

Christy Ring Cup Final

- Westmeath 1–23 : 2–18 Down

Nicky Rackard Cup Final

- London 5–8 : 1–5 Louth

All-Ireland Senior Football Championship Final

- Tyrone 1–16 : 2–10 Kerry

Tommy Murphy Cup Final

- Tipperary 1–16 : 2–10 Wexford

All-Ireland Senior Camogie Championship Final

- Cork 1–17 : 1–13 Tipperary

All-Ireland Senior Ladies Football Championship Final

- Cork 1–11 : 0–8 Galway

=== Golf ===
- Pádraig Harrington won the Honda Classic at Palm Beach Gardens, Florida.
- Paul McGinley won the Volvo Masters at Valderrama Golf Club in Spain.
- The Nissan Irish Open was won by Stephen Dodd (Wales).

=== Rugby union ===
- 2005 Six Nations Championship
  - Ireland 28-17 Italy
  - Ireland 40-13 Scotland
  - Ireland 19-13 England
  - Ireland 19–26 France
  - Ireland 20–32 Wales
- Autumn Internationals
  - Ireland 7–45 New Zealand
  - Ireland 14–30 Australia
  - Ireland 43-12 Romania
- 2004–05 Heineken Cup
  - Munster and Leinster both qualify for the quarter-finals but fail to progress.

== Deaths ==
Patrick Denis O'Donnell died in January.

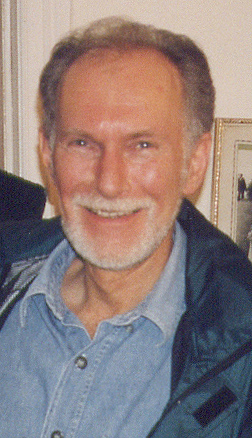
Hugh Lambert died in December.

January to March

- 1 January – Patrick Denis O'Donnell, military historian, writer and former Commandant of the Irish Defence Forces (born 1922).
- 4 January – Paul Darragh, showjumper (born 1953).
- 7 January – Eileen Desmond, Labour Party TD, Cabinet Minister, MEP and Seanad Éireann member (born 1932).
- 11 January – Ian Anderson, former President of the Legislative Council of the Isle of Man (born 1925).
- 27 January – Gordon Lambert, art collector and former member of the Seanad (born 1919).
- 17 February – Dan O'Herlihy, actor (born 1919).
- 9 March – Michael O'Higgins, Fine Gael TD and Senator (born 1917).
- 10 March – Dave Allen, comedian (born 1936).

April to June

- 2 April – Jack Stanley Gibson, surgeon and writer (born 1909).
- 11 April – Mattie McDonagh, former Gaelic footballer with Galway (born 1936).
- 1 June – Geoffrey Toone, actor (born 1910).
- 7 June – Seán Doherty, former Fianna Fáil TD and cabinet minister (born 1944).
- 18 June – Gerald Davis, artist (born 1938).
- 19 June – Tom Curran, 86, former Waterford hurler.
- 27 June – Frank Harte, singer and song collector (born 1933).

July to September

- 6 August – James Wilson, composer (born 1922).
- 14 August – George Carpenter, Ireland's longest-living Olympian.
- 21 August – Liam Burke, former Fine Gael TD (born 1928).
- 27 August – Seán Purcell, former Gaelic footballer with Galway (born 1928).
- 8 September – Noel Cantwell, former international soccer player (born 1932).
- 10 September – Pádraig Bourke, former Kildare Gaelic footballer.
- 15 September – James Gogarty, former engineer and Flood Tribunal whistleblower.
- 21 September – Humphrey Kelleher, former Gaelic footballer with Cork.

October to December

- 5 October – Maura Murphy, writer (born 1928).
- 22 October – Liam Lawlor, Fianna Fáil politician, car accident in Moscow (born 1944).
- 23 October – Jack Mahon, former Gaelic footballer with Galway (born 1933.
- 30 October – Peter Driscoll, author and Chief Radio News sub-editor with Raidió Teilifís Éireann.
- 25 November – James McLoughlin, Roman Catholic Bishop of Galway (born 1929).
- 6 December – Tim Kennelly, former Gaelic footballer with Kerry (born 1954).
- 26 December – Hugh Lambert, journalist and editor (born 1944).

== See also ==
- 2005 in Irish television
