= Veritas Communications =

- Parent company: Irish Catholic Bishops' Conference
- Founded: 1899
- Country of origin: Ireland
- Headquarters location: Dublin
- Publication types: Books, magazines
- Official website: www.veritasbooksonline.com

Veritas Communications is a company owned by Irish Catholic Bishops' Conference which was a publisher and retailer of religious books and materials. Veritas had a number of retail outlets in Dublin city, Blanchardstown, Cork, Limerick, Sligo and Derry. Veritas Publications publishes the Catholic magazine Intercom. Veritas also sold books, Magazines, CDs. DVDs, cards, candles and other items of a religious nature.

Veritas publishes and distributes textbooks used in primary schools, such as the Alive-O and Grow in Love series, and secondary schools in Ireland. Veritas publish its books in the United Kingdom under the name Lindisfarne Books.

Veritas publishes Intercom, a magazine of liturgical and pastoral resources for clergy that comes out 10 times a year.

Veritas announced that it would close all retail shop operations in 2024.

== History ==
Veritas has its origins in the Catholic Truth Society of Ireland founded in 1899 on the model of the English Catholic Truth Society. It opened its first shop on Lower Abbey Street, Dublin in 1928 and the Veritas Company was established. By the late 1960s Veritas had run into serious financial problems resulting in a 1969 merger of the Catholic Truth Society and the Communications Centre in Booterstown, Dublin (which had been founded in 1967) to form the Catholic Communications Institute of Ireland under the leadership of Father Joe Dunn. Father Dunn is credited with putting the publishing operation, renamed as Veritas Communications and often referred to as Veritas Publications, on a profitable basis. Catholic Communications Institute operates both Veritas Publishing, and Intercom magazine, both created in 1969.

Veritas has in the past has acted as a travel agency organising travel to religious sites, such as Knock, Lourdes, Fatima etc.

On 9 February 2024, it was announced that Veritas would close by the end of the year.

== People associated with Veritas ==
A number of people from the Irish Media have been involved in Veritas and Catholic Communications organisations and initiatives over the years, such as the broadcaster Bunny Carr, Tom Savage, and the Irish Press journalist and Sunday Press editor Vincent Jennings who served as chairman of the company from 1987 until 1992. The current president of Veritas is Dr. Brendan Leahy bishop of Limerick, and the director is Aidan Chester who in 2016 succeeded Maura Hyland who had been director since 2000.
