= Steve Conway =

Steve, Steven or Stephen Conway may refer to:

- Steve Conway (politician) (born 1944), State Senator from Washington State
- Steve Conway (singer) (1920–1952), British singer
- Steve Conway (writer), broadcaster and writer
- Steven Conway (boxer) (born 1977), English boxer of the 1990s and 2000s
- Stephen Conway (born 1957), bishop
- Stephen Conway (property developer) (born 1948), British property developer
- Stephen Conway (cricketer) (born 1974), English academic and cricketer
