= Oatlands College =

- Stillorgan Road, Mount Merrion, County Dublin, A94 W7W7; Ireland

Information
- Type: Secondary School Voluntary
- Motto: Facere et docere (To do and to teach)
- Religious affiliation: Christian Brothers
- Denomination: Roman Catholic
- Established: 1955
- Principal: Caroline Garrett
- Years offered: 1st Year-6th Year
- Gender: Male
- Age: 12 to 18
- Enrollment: 634 (2025)
- Colours: Green and red

Oatlands College (Irish: Coláiste Fhearann an Choirce) is a voluntary Christian Brothers secondary school for boys aged 12–18, located in Mount Merrion, County Dublin in Ireland. It prepares students for Junior Certificate and Leaving Certificate examinations.

== Development ==
The Christian Brothers first established a community in 1951, before opening the school in 1955. It is now under the Trusteeship of the Edmund Rice Schools Trust. The school added a single storey extension in 1969 and later added a sports hall in 1980. After some modernisation in 1995, the school opened a new wing in 1999. In the summer of 2010, a new technology room, drawing room, music room, a second computer room, two new class rooms and two new science laboratories were added to the building. On 10 May 2012, a new sports hall with a canteen and a new classroom was opened by the President of Ireland at that time, Michael D. Higgins.

== Extra-curricular activities ==
=== Sport ===
Sports undertaken at Oatlands include GAA, soccer, basketball, badminton, tennis, table tennis, cricket and athletics. The school has also a successful golf team who became the South Dublin champions in 2018, 2019 and 2020. In 2017, the senior badminton team won the South Dublin Cup. In 2018, the junior badminton won the South Dublin Cup with the seniors losing out to Benildus College.

=== Other activities ===
School teams enter business quiz competitions, inter-school debate competitions, student enterprise awards, the Young Scientist and Technology Exhibition, Young Social Innovators and Edmund Rice Awards.

Each year, a college musical is performed by Transition Year students in association with the girls from Rockford Manor.

A school newsletter, 'Oatlands News', is published twice a year.

== Sex abuse scandal ==
Christian Brother Patrick John Kelly, who was principal of Oatlands school in the 1980s, settled a claim in 2007 for sexual assault against a former student. Kelly served a prison sentence in Arbour Hill Prison after being convicted of sexual abuse charges relating to other people.

== Alumni ==
- Niall Williams, author and Man Booker Prize nominee 2014
- Brian Brennan, author and journalist
- Paddy Carr, GAA manager; born in Fanad and raised in Dublin
- Kenny Carroll, Irish cricketer
- Michael Carwood, Irish press journalist
- Don Conroy, artist and RTÉ Television presenter
- Paul Griffin, Gaelic footballer
- Dermot Moran, philosophy professor
- Dermot Morgan, comedian, star of Father Ted
- Paddy Kavanagh, footballer
- Ross O'Carroll, hurler
- Gerry Hannan, Limerick investigative journalist
- Éamon Ó Cuív, TD, Fianna Fáil party politician and former cabinet minister
- Stephen Collins, political editor of The Irish Times
