= The Boys in Green =

Song by The Republic Of Ireland Soccer Squad
- B-side: "Molly Malone"
- Released: 1988
- Songwriter: Michael Carwood

"The Boys in Green" is a song by Michael Carwood a journalist with The Irish Press. The song was written for Ireland's 1988 European Championship.

Credited to the "Republic of Ireland Soccer Squad", it spent four weeks at #1 in the Irish charts in June / July 1988, prior to the tournament the Irish Soccer team and management performed the song with Gay Byrne, on The Late Late Show.

The song was reworked by the Dublin City Ramblers on their album Home and away, for the Italy 90, World Cup, with the word "Italy" use instead of Germany, and the lines .. we can celebrate, Ireland, Ireland in Euro '88 , was replaced with We'll say Ireland Ireland we're on our way to Rome, Ireland Ireland to bring the world cup home.
