= Vortex Theater Company =

Vortex logo

The Vortex Theater Company was founded in 1983 by playwright, director, and actor Robert Coles and was originally dedicated to the mission of presenting new works by emerging playwrights.

== Sanford Meisner Theater ==
In 1984, the company built its performance space in what had been an empty storefront loft at 164 Eleventh Avenue in a then-deserted part of far west Chelsea. In 1985 The Vortex's space was named the Sanford Meisner Theater in honor of the famed acting teacher. Tony Randall served as master of ceremonies for the naming ceremony and many of Sandy's former students and peers attended, performed, or spoke, including David Mamet, Bob Fosse, Maureen Stapleton, Anne Jackson, Eli Wallach, Diane Keaton, Geraldine Page, Frances Sternhagen.

The Sanford Meisner Theater hosted performances by hundreds of different arts groups including not only theater but music, dance, and opera companies as well. Other playwrights and performers whose work has been presented by the Vortex Theater Company include Nicky Silver, Jim Fall, David Greenspan, Patricia Scanlon, Don Nigro, and Bathsheba Doran.

Under new leadership in 2004 after the death of managing director Anthony John Lizzul the Vortex changed its mission to creating a diverse range of classical structures reconstructed for a contemporary audience. Focusing on unconventional theatrical experiences, the Vortex produced over 20 shows and garnered two Drama Desk Award nominations, and six New York Innovative Theatre Award Nominations.

== NYC Halloween Haunted House ==
The NYC Halloween Haunted House was a year-round haunted attraction in New York City. Opened in 2009, the haunted house was designed exclusively for adults 18 and over, and each patron is forced to sign a waiver and walk through the entire experience completely alone. The NYCHHH was known for producing an invitation only off-season spring/summer attraction named the "Midsummer Nightmare", as well as creating controversy with its liberal use of violence and aggressive sexual content. "America's horror magazine" Fangoria called it a "finely tuned tour de force in terror and a must for horror enthusiasts in the New York City area." And in its 2010 year-end round-up, The New York Times declared the haunted house: "the extreme theater event of the year." The NYC Halloween Haunted House is produced by the Vortex Theater Company and created and designed by Josh Randall and Kristjan Thor. Earlier versions included:

- "Midsummer Nightmare 2009", May/June 2009 at the Sanford Meisner Theater, New York City
- "NYC Halloween Haunted House 2009", October 2009 at the Sanford Meisner Theater, New York City
- "Midsummer Nightmare 2010", June 2010 at a private hotel room in New York City
- "NYC Halloween Haunted House 2010", October 2010 at the ground floor store-front at 115 West 27th Street, New York City

== Other Past Productions ==
- A Slow Boat in Deep Water, 1986, by Gary Welz, world premier
- Chorus Girls on Mars!, 1988, by James C. Kantor, world premier
- Free Will and Wanton Lust, 1991, by Nicky Silver, Helen Hayes Award for Best New Play
- Cute Boys in Their Underpants, 1992, by Robert Coles, world premier
- Agamemnon, 2005, by Aeschylus, Drama Desk Award Nomination, "Outstanding Director of a Play - Gisela Cardenas"
- Deviant 2005, by A. Rey Pamatmat, New York Innovative Theatre Awards Nomination "Outstanding Production of a Play" and "Outstanding Full Length Script"
- On the Stage of the Blind, 2005, by Maurice Maeterlinck (1890), New York Innovative Theatre Awards Nomination "Outstanding Sound Design" and "Outstanding Light Design"
- In Delirium:The Sorrows of Young Werther, 2006, by Goethe (1774), New York Innovative Theatre Awards Nomination "Outstanding Solo Performance"
- H.M.S. PINAFORE, 2007, by Arthur Sullivan (composer), W.S. Gilbert (author), Drama Desk Award Nomination, "Outstanding Revival of a Musical"
- Kiss of the Spider Woman (musical), 2007, first NYC Revival since Broadway run.
