= Jill Greenfield =

British solicitor specialising in civil claims

- Citizenship: British
- Occupation: Solicitor
- Known for: Civil litigation

Jill Greenfield is a British solicitor and chair of the Fawcett Society. She specialises in catastrophic injury and public-interest litigation.

== Career ==
=== Sexual assault cases ===
Her specialist areas are catastrophic injury, public-interest litigation, and civil claims involving allegations of rape and sexual assault.

In 2006, Greenfield represented Amanda Lawson in a civil claim against the estate of Christopher Dawes. The High Court awarded Lawson £259,000; The Guardian described the case as one of only a handful of civil damages claims for rape to have reached the English courts.

From 2017, Greenfield represented women pursuing civil claims against Harvey Weinstein in the United Kingdom. She lodged the first UK civil claim against him and later represented six British accusers, some of whom initially remained anonymous because of concerns about intimidation.

From 2020, Greenfield advised alleged British victims of Jeffrey Epstein and urged them to apply to the compensation programme established by his estate.

In 2023, two former employees of hedge fund manager Crispin Odey instructed Greenfield to bring civil claims alleging sexual assault and harassment.

=== Child safety and public protection ===
Greenfield represented the family of a seven-week-old infant who died from positional asphyxia in a Bednest cot.

In 2001, she represented the family of a child who suffered brain damage after coming into contact with the E. coli bacterium while on a school trip to a farm. In 2009, she prepared a group action on behalf of families affected by the E. coli outbreak at Godstone Farm in Surrey. In 2014, ten children received compensation following the outbreak, with Greenfield acting for claimants in a group of 35 cases.

She also represented the family of a teenager who fell to his death from the Great Orme during a Scouting trip to Wales. The inquest found that while the Scout leader and his assistant were responsible, The Scout Association also contributed to his death.

== Terrorism compensation ==
By 2005, Greenfield was acting pro bono for British victims of overseas terrorism and lobbying for a state-funded compensation scheme after insurers excluded terrorism from cover. In 2009, she represented five victims of the 2005 Kuşadası minibus bombing in Turkey.

In 2006, Greenfield supported families injured in the 2005 Sharm El Sheikh bombings and criticised compensation arrangements that covered damage to buildings after attacks in mainland Britain but not personal injuries suffered by British victims abroad.

Greenfield was part of a working party comprising legislators and victims that researched and negotiated the Victims of Overseas Terrorism Compensation Scheme. She later represented survivors of the 2017 Westminster attack, including Andrei Burnaz, who was injured on Westminster Bridge.

== Public service roles ==
In July 2026, Greenfield succeeded Harriet Harman as the Fawcett Society's chair.

She worked with Time's Up UK and Creative UK on proposals for the Independent Standards Authority, intended to address bullying and harassment in the creative industries.
