= Niall Williams =

Niall Williams may refer to:

- Niall Williams (rugby union) (born 1988), New Zealand sportswoman
- Niall Williams (writer) (born 1958), Irish writer
