= Aidan Dunne =

Irish journalist

- Education: National College of Art and Design
- Occupation: Journalist
- Writing career
- Notable work: Patrick Scott

Aidan Dunne is a visual arts critic and contributor to The Irish Times. He has written a book on the artist Patrick Scott.

== Education ==
Dunne is a graduate of the National College of Art and Design, Dublin.

== Career ==
Aidan Dunne has written regularly for The Irish Times for decades. He was art critic of In Dublin magazine, Sunday Press and the Sunday Tribune. Dunne has written extensively on Irish art, with essays on Michael Mulcahy, Victor Sloan, Patrick Scott, Hughie O'Donoghue, Patrick Swift, and Jennifer Trouton. He has also written an essay on Russian photographer and artist Alexey Titarenko.

== Bibliography ==
- Patrick Scott, published by Liberties Press in 2008; 2010- ISBN 1-905483-53-8; ISBN 978-1-905483-53-2
