= Henry Barry =

Henry Barry may refer to:

- Henry W. Barry (1840–1875), Union army officer and U.S. representative
- Henry Barry (British Army officer) (1750–1822), British Army officer
- Henry Deacon Barry (1849–1908), British Royal Navy officer
- Henry Barry, 3rd Baron Barry of Santry (1680–1734), Anglo-Irish soldier and official
- Henry Barry, 4th Baron Barry of Santry (1710–1751), Irish peer

== See also ==
- Thomas Henry Barry (1855–1919), U.S. Army general
- Harry Barry, Irish doctor
- Henry Berry (disambiguation)
