= Four Letters of Love =

2024 British drama film

- Film poster
- Directed by: Polly Steele
- Screenplay by: Niall Williams
- Based on: Four Letters of Love by Niall Williams
- Produced by: Debbie Gray; Douglas Cummins; Martina Niland
- Starring: Pierce Brosnan; Helena Bonham-Carter; Gabriel Byrne; Ann Skelly
- Edited by: Chris Gill
- Music by: Anne Nikitin
- Production companies: Cornerstone; AX1 Films; Port Pictures; London Town Films; Genesius Pictures
- Release dates: November 2024 (British and Irish Film Festival); 18 July 2025 (UK and Ireland)
- Running time: 109 minutes
- Countries: United Kingdom; Ireland
- Language: English

Four Letters of Love is a 2024 drama film directed by Polly Steele. It is written by Niall Williams, who adapted his book of the same name. It stars Pierce Brosnan, Helena Bonham-Carter, and Gabriel Byrne.

The film was released in November 2024 at the British and Irish Film Festival and in theatres in the UK and Ireland on 18 July 2025 to mostly unfavourable reviews.

== Plot ==
In 1971, civil servant William Coughlan, seeing a sunbeam illuminating his desk blotter, suddenly feels inspired, so he quits to become an artistic painter. This shocks his wife Bette and 17-year-old son Nicholas.

Simultaneously, on a west coast island, Isabel and Sean Gore are watching the sea when he inexplicably collapses. Suddenly uncommunicative, he becomes a wheelchair user. Soon after, Isabel is sent to be educated by nuns on the mainland according to island custom, as her parents Margaret and Muiris decide it is time.

Back in Dublin, as the now-painter William seeks inspiration, he heads to the western coast. Three months later, mother and son are suffering, wondering if or when he will return.

Meanwhile, an unhappy Isabel escapes from the school. Peader happens to be driving by, so helps her over the fence. Once back at the school, Isabel is told to stay kneeling in contrition, but soon tires.

When William finally returns to Dublin, Nicholas is relieved, hoping life will return to normal. However, when William visits Bette in the bedroom, which she has not left for days, he finds her dead. Shortly after, he insists on returning to the West for another week, upsetting Nicholas.

The poet and schoolteacher Muiris, anguishing over Sean's prolonged incapacitation, is unable to write. At the school, Peader gets the nuns to release Isabel, supposedly for a funeral. They go off together to a pub, dance and kiss.

Nicholas secretly follows William on the bus west, even briefly coinciding with Isabel on it as she is off to spend a day at her parents. He follows William all the way to the sea. When Nicholas fears William will drown, he follows him in. However it is William who saves Nicholas, then contently declares that god still must want them around.

When Isabel arrives home, insisting that the school gave her time off, Margaret is suspicious. As the young woman happily wheels out Sean to tell him about Peader. Muiris is glad to see her, and tries to mollify her mother's concerns.

The Coughlans stay awhile so William can paint. Later, before returning to London, all but the painting Nicholas was carrying is spoiled. Upon their return to Dublin, William promptly donates it to a poetry competition as a prize.

Isabel, whose lie to the nuns has been discovered, is expelled from school and seeks Peader in his family's shop. Discovering he has been pining for her, he gratefully greets her. Meanwhile, in Dublin, William dies in a house fire, while Nicholas is out completing his degree.

Three months pass. Margaret visits Isabel who, less enthusiastic about Peader now, is resigned to carry on. Margaret points out that lasting love must start very strong, and asks if she is pregnant. Later, Peader's mum warns Isabel that he never stays 'in love' for long. When she confronts Peader, he admits it, yet asks her to marry him.

Early on her wedding day, Isabel confides in Sean she is unsure about marrying Peader. On the edge of the sea, she asks for a sign to cancel. Meanwhile, Nicholas is en route from Dublin. After living with one of his father's former colleagues, who suggests a job as a civil servant, he feels inspired to travel to the west coast island to see Mr. Gore, who won the painting with his love poem.

Arriving at the Gores' soon after the wedding, Nicholas finds Margaret and Sean at home. He stays with him while she fetches Muiris. Inexplicably, Sean begins to talk, and asks for help standing up - the Gores find him chatting with Nicholas upon their return. Overjoyed, the reunited family invites Nicholas to stay. They prepare and have a meal together and dance.

A connection soon forms between Nicholas and Isabel. Margaret senses this, and is soon blocking love letters he tries to send to Isabel. She burns the first, throws the next into the sea and buries the third. As Nicholas writes multitudes more letters, Margaret brings out Muiris' winning love poem, which prophesies four letters will unite two loves.

Going to the beach, Nicholas finds Isabel returning to the island on a small boat. As they embrace, the ghosts of his parents approach on one side, her family on the other. Now William's painting is shown portraying this very scene.

== Cast ==
- Pierce Brosnan as William Coughlan
- Helena Bonham-Carter as Margaret Gore
- Gabriel Byrne as Muiris Gore
- Ann Skelly as Isabel Gore
- Ferdia Walsh-Peelo as Peader
- Pat Shortt as John Flannery
- Fionn O'Shea as Nicholas Coughlan
- Donal Finn as Sean Gore
- Imelda May as Bette Coughlan

== Production ==
The original novel had been published in 1997. Several companies bid for film rights, ending with Fox 2000 Pictures and Fox Searchlight Pictures teaming up to have Stanley Tucci write and direct. This version never got past development and the rights eventually lapsed.

The film is adapted by Niall Williams from his own novel of the same name (1997). The cinematography is by Damien Elliott and it is produced by Cornerstone, AX1 Films, Port Pictures, London Town Films, and Genesius Pictures, with Debbie Gray, Douglas Cummins and Martina Niland as producers.

Principal photography took place in March 2023 with filming locations such as Ulster Folk Museum in County Down, Murlough Bay in County Antrim in Northern Ireland and Dunfanaghy in County Donegal, in the Republic of Ireland.

The cast includes Pierce Brosnan, Helena Bonham-Carter, Gabriel Byrne, Ann Skelly and Pat Shortt.

== Release ==
The film screened at the 2025 Dublin International Film Festival prior to a theatrical release in UK and Irish cinemas from 18 July 2025.

== Reception ==
On the review aggregator website Rotten Tomatoes, 39% of 23 critics' reviews are positive. Metacritic, which uses a weighted average, assigned the film a score of 37 out of 100, based on eight critics, indicating "generally unfavorable" reviews.

Glenn Kenny of RogerEbert.com gave the film one out of four stars and wrote, "There's nothing like a good Irish movie with some edge to it. So it's too bad that Four Letters of Love is nothing like a good Irish movie with some edge to it."
