= Vincent Jennings =

Irish journalist

Vincent Jennings (1937–2010), was an Irish Journalist, and who served as editor of The Sunday Press from 1968 until 1986, before becoming part of the management of The Irish Press.

Born in Dublin in 1937, he grew up in Clontarf. Vincent was educated at Presentation College, Bray, before going to University College Dublin, where he earned a BA in History and English and MA, he also earned a Higher Diploma in Education prior to pursuing his career in journalism, joining the Evening Press in 1961.

Jennings stood down as editor of the Sunday Press, succeeded by Micheal Keane, to become General Manager of the group he also served as a number of roles with the Irish Press group including Chairman (1992-2005), and Chief Executive. Jennings was part of the management of the Irish Press Group during the controversial times, when the titles ceased publication, and was part of attempts to relaunch the paper. He stood down as a director in 2008.

From 1987 until 1992, Jennings served as chairman of the Catholic Communications Institute.
