= Con Houlihan =

Irish sportswriter

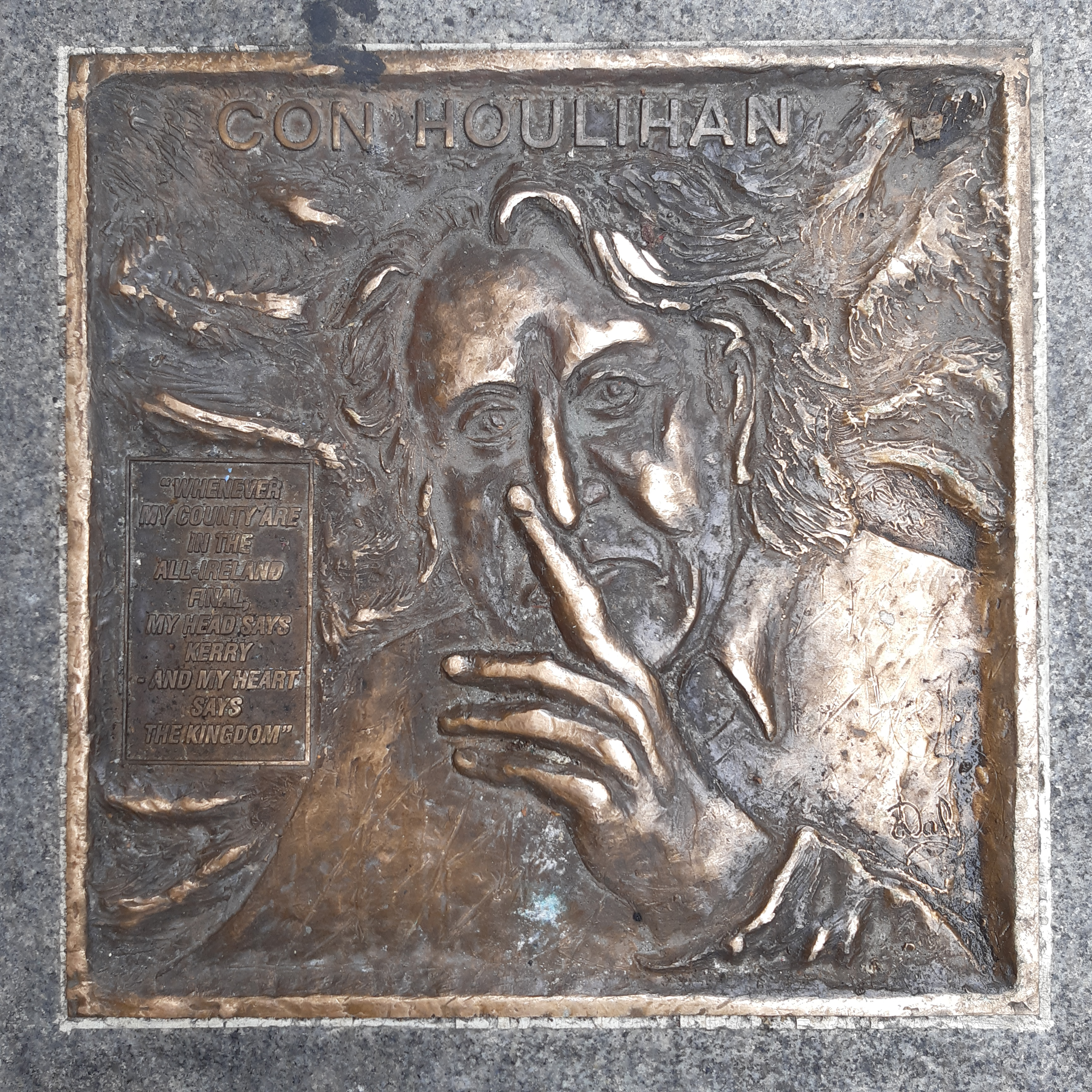
- Houlihan's plaque outside The Palace Bar on Fleet Street in Dublin
- Born: 6 December 1925; Castleisland, County Kerry, Ireland
- Died: 4 August 2012 (aged 86); Dublin, Ireland
- Occupation: Sports journalist
- Writing career
- Notable works: More Than a Game, A Harvest

Con Houlihan (6 December 1925 – 4 August 2012) was an Irish sportswriter. Despite only progressing to national journalism at the age of 46, he became "the greatest and the best-loved Irish sports journalist of all".

== Early life ==
Houlihan was born in Castleisland and attended a local primary school. He won a scholarship to Castlemartyr College in Castlemartyr, County Cork but was expelled for creating and circulating an unofficial student newspaper. He finished his secondary school education at the Christian Brothers school in Tralee and then went on to University College Cork after working as a labourer in England for a year. After graduating with a Masters in English he returned to England to teach at a prep school in Hastings.

== Journalism career ==
Over a lengthy career, Houlihan covered many Irish and international sporting events, from Gaelic football and hurling finals, to soccer and rugby World Cups, the Olympics and numberless race meetings inside and outside Ireland.

He was a journalist with the Irish Press group writing for The Irish Press, Evening Press and sometimes The Sunday Press, until the group's demise in 1995. He wrote the "Tributaries" column and Evening Press back sports page "Con Houlihan" column.

== Death ==
Houlihan died in the morning of 4 August 2012 in St James's Hospital in Dublin. Often considered one of Ireland's finest writers, he left behind a legacy of immense sports journalism that spanned over 60 years. A minute's silence was observed in his memory ahead of Kerry's All-Ireland Senior Football Championship quarter-final defeat to Donegal at Croke Park the following day. His last column, in which he wished Katie Taylor well, was published the day after his death. His funeral took place on 8 August 2012 at St. Kevin's Church, Harrington Street, Dublin, followed by cremation at Mount Jerome Crematorium.

== Awards and honours ==
A bronze bust of Houlihan was unveiled in his hometown of Castleisland in 2004. In 2011, a bronze plaque was installed outside The Palace bar in Dublin. The sculpture is in the foyer of The Bank pub on College Green. Cons Corner and a Bronze Bust with a quote are in The Palace Bar.

== List of works ==
- More Than a Game
- A Harvest: New, Rare and Uncollected Essays
- Close the Wicket Gate: Tales from the Kilmichael Bar Foreword for Johanna O'Mahony Walters
- Death of a King and Other Stories
- In So Many Words: The Best of Con Houlihan
- Windfalls
