= Niall Williams (writer) =

Irish writer (born 1958)

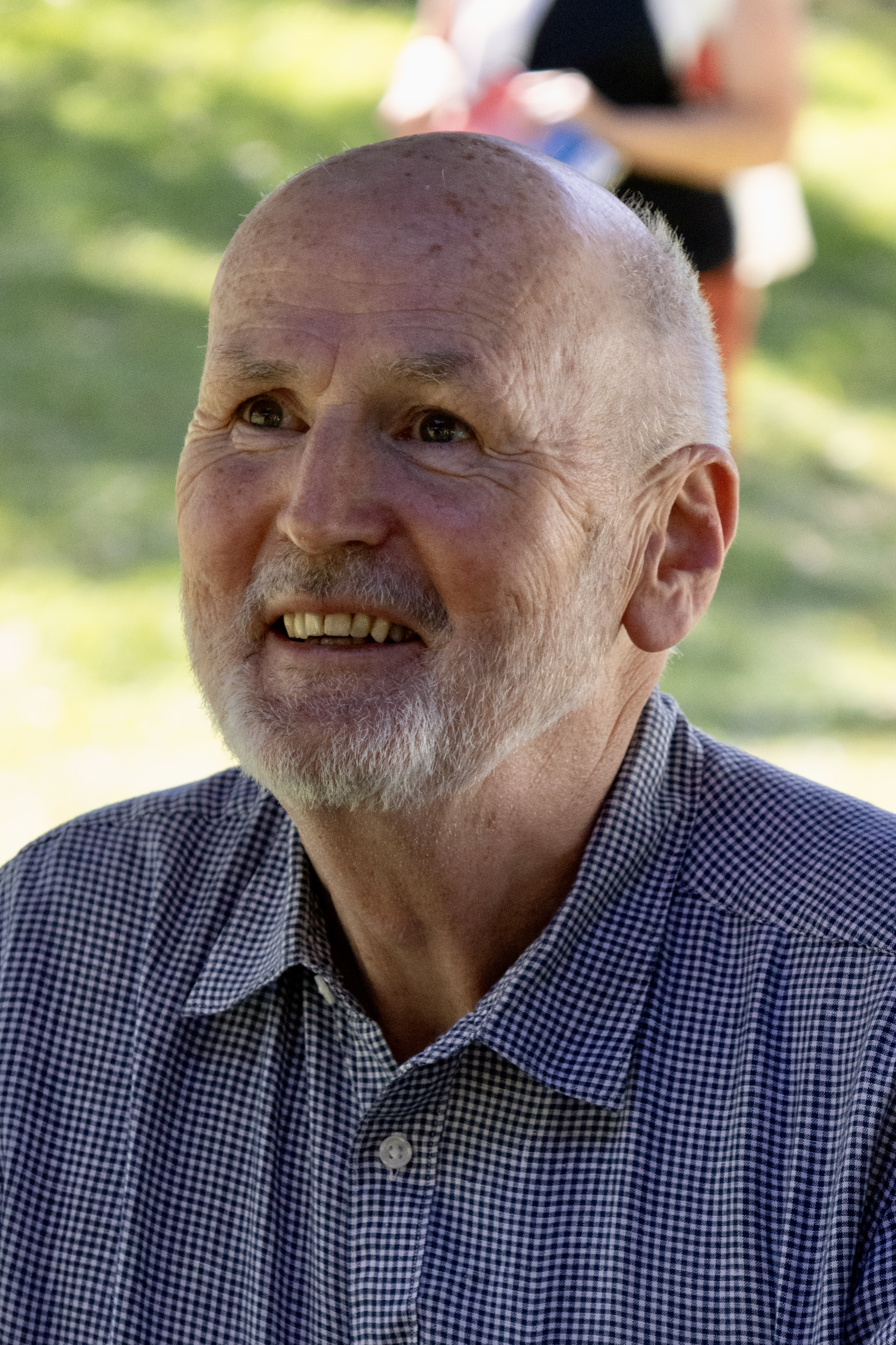
- Williams at the 2025 Adelaide Writers' Week
- Born: 1958 (age 67–68); Dublin, Ireland
- Education: Oatlands College
- Alma mater: University College Dublin
- Occupations: Novelist, playwright, screenwriter
- Spouse: Christine Breen
- Children: 2
- Writing career
- Genres: Fiction, literary fiction, magic realism, historical fiction
- Notable works: Four Letters of Love (1997); As It Is In Heaven (1999); Fall of the Light (2001); History of the Rain (2014); This Is Happiness (2019)
- Website: niallwilliams.com

Niall Williams (born 1958) is an Irish writer of novels, plays, and nonfiction. He is known for his novels Four Letters of Love (1997), As It Is in Heaven (1999), Fall of the Light (2008), History of the Rain (2014), and This Is Happiness (2019).

== Early life and education ==
Niall Williams was born in Dublin, Ireland, in 1958. His parents' home was not filled with books, but his parents wanted him to be better educated than they were, and his father took him to Pembroke Library every two weeks to encourage reading.

Williams attended Oatlands College, a boys' school in Stillorgan, County Dublin, and graduated with a Master's of Arts in Modern American literature from University College Dublin, where he met his future wife, writer Christine Breen.

== Career ==
Williams' first published story was printed in The Irish Press when he was 18. He has said that the £25 cheque and nod of approval he received for it were the confirmation he needed from the world to dedicate his life to writing.

After a year lecturing at the Université de Caen in Normandy, France, Williams moved to New York City (with Breen). He worked briefly at Fox and Sutherland's bookstore in Mount Kisco, New York, before becoming a copywriter at Avon Books.

After five years, in 1985, Williams and Breen returned to Ireland and moved to Kilmihil, County Clare, and began co-writing factual accounts of life in rural Ireland.

=== Non-fiction ===
Williams' first four books, co-written with Breen, were nonfiction about their life in a 200-year-old farmhouse in County Clare, and were written primarily for an American audience.

=== Plays ===
In 1991, Williams' first play, The Murphy Initiative, was staged at the Abbey Theatre in Dublin. His second play, A Little Like Paradise, was produced on the Peacock stage of the Abbey Theatre in 1995. His third play, The Way You Look Tonight, was produced by Galway’s Druid Theatre Company in 1999.

=== Novels ===
Four Letters of Love, Williams' first novel, was published in 1997 to acclaim.

The Fall of Light is set in the 19th century and was Williams' first foray into historical fiction.

In 2006, Williams' published his novella, The Unrequited. He also wrote two young adult novels, Boy in the World (2007) and Boy and Man (2008).

In 2014, Williams started a series of novels set in Faha, a fictional village in the west of Ireland. Like Macondo in Gabriel García Márquez's works, Faha is a village steeped in magic realism that is a backdrop for Williams' stories.

Williams' 2024 novel Time of the Child is also set in Faha. Lucy Popsecu, writing in The Guardian, called it "a slow-burning, finely crafted novel about second chances, humanity and familial love".

=== Screenplays ===
Williams has also written screenplays for television and film, including screenplays for Four Letters of Love and This Is Happiness.

Four Letters of Love was made into a feature film, directed by Polly Steele and starring Pierce Brosnan, Helena Bonham-Carter, and Gabriel Byrne. It screened at the 2025 Dublin International Film Festival before its theatrical release in UK and Irish cinemas on 18 July.

== Recognition ==
- 1997: Four Letters of Love named Notable Book of the Year in The New York Times Book Review
- 1999: As It Is In Heaven shortlisted for the International IMPAC Dublin Literary Award
- 1999: As It Is In Heaven shortlisted for the Irish Times Literature Prize
- 2000: The Fall of Light longlisted for the International IMPAC Dublin Literary Award
- 2014: History of the Rain longlisted for the Man Booker Prize
- 2019: This Is Happiness listed in Washington Post's Best Books of the Year
- 2019: This Is Happiness shortlisted for the An Post Irish Book Awards Best Book of the Year

== Selected works ==
=== Fiction ===
- Four Letters Of Love (1997)
- As It Is In Heaven (1999)
- The Way You Look Tonight (2000)
- The Fall of Light (2001)
- Only Say the Word (2005)
- The Unrequited (2006)
- Boy in the World (2007)
- Boy and Man (2008)
- John: A Novel (2008)
- History of the Rain (2015)
- This Is Happiness (2019)
- The Unrequited (2021) (novella)
- Time of the Child (2024)

=== Non-Fiction (with Christine Breen) ===
- O Come Ye Back to Ireland (1987)
- When Summer’s in the Meadow (1989)
- The Pipes are Calling (1990)
- The Luck of the Irish (1995)
- In Kiltumper: A Year in an Irish Garden (2021)

== Personal life ==
Williams married American writer and artist Christine Breen, whom he met at University College Dublin. They have two children.

They moved to Kiltumper, in west County Clare, in Ireland, to live in Breen's grandfather's old cottage. Both teach creative writing workshops. Williams does not read reviews.
