= The Wilby Conspiracy =

- Original film poster
- Directed by: Ralph Nelson
- Written by: Rodney Amateau; Harold Nebenzal
- Based on: The Wilby Conspiracy; 1972 novel by Peter Driscoll
- Produced by: Martin Baum; Paul M. Heller; Helmut Dantine
- Starring: Sidney Poitier; Michael Caine; Nicol Williamson; Prunella Gee
- Cinematography: John Coquillon
- Edited by: Ernest Walter
- Music by: Stanley Myers
- Color process: Color by DeLuxe
- Production companies: Baum/Dantine Productions; Optimus Productions Ltd.
- Distributed by: United Artists
- Release dates: August 1975 (UK); 30 July 1975 (LAC); 15 August 1975 (Chicago); 3 September 1975 (NYC)
- Running time: 105 minutes
- Country: United Kingdom
- Language: English

The Wilby Conspiracy is a 1975 British adventure thriller film directed by Ralph Nelson and starring Michael Caine, Sidney Poitier, and Nicol Williamson. Filmed in Kenya, it was written by Rodney Amateau, based on the 1972 novel by Peter Driscoll. It had a limited release in the US.

== Plot ==
In apartheid-era South Africa, Shack Twala, a black revolutionary who had served time on Robben Island, is freed by Rina van Niekerk, his Afrikaner defence attorney, because he would be a victim of retroactive legislation. Rina, estranged from her husband Blane, is having a relationship with a British mining engineer, Jim Keogh, who has attended Shack's trial. Surprised by the verdict, Rina, Jim and Shack go off to celebrate at her house. They are stopped by policemen who are conducting identity document checks and arresting everyone who does not have their papers on them. As Shack has only just been released from prison he will not receive his papers until the next day. The policeman and Shack antagonise each other leading to Shack being handcuffed and arrested. When Rina attempts to pull the policeman off Shack, the policeman hits her, knocking her to the ground. Jim assaults and knocks out the policeman making all three fugitives.

At a police station, a police brigadier is chastised by the racist Major Horn of the Bureau of State Security (BOSS) for not only arresting Shack but continuing with their random identity checks and arrests that have infuriated world opinion.

The three fugitives are followed and monitored by BOSS to lead them to discover their escape route to Botswana and its facilitators, Indian dentists Anil Mukarjee and Persis Ray; a stash of stolen uncut diamonds being used to fund the Black Congress Party and its leader, a man named Wilby Xaba.

Shack learns that the diamonds are hidden at the bottom of a sinkhole. With Shack and Mukarjee's help, Jim retrieves the diamonds from the 76-metre deep hole, but Ray, wanting to use the diamonds to emigrate from South Africa, kills Mukarjee and attempts to rob them of the diamonds. Shack fights Ray to protect the diamonds, and in the commotion, he throws her into the sinkhole where she plummets to her death. Diamonds in hand, they have arranged for Blane, a private pilot, to fly them out of the country, which he does after Rina blackmails him by threatening to make public his drug usage and relationships with black women, illegal in South Africa.

The three arrive at the South Africa–Botswana border, where the police, who were there waiting for them, give chase in jeeps. After evading them, they board Blane's aeroplane and are chased by South African Air Force aeroplanes over the border into Botswana. They manage to escape the pursuing aeroplanes and land on a makeshift runway and disembark, with Blane departing in his aeroplane. They make their way to one of the Black Congress Party's camps where they meet many villagers, Wilby Xaba, and armed guards. Suddenly, BOSS agents arrive in a commandeered lorry, kill the guards, and take Wilby prisoner, revealing that he was their real target all along and that the diamonds retrieved from the sinkhole were forgeries. As the BOSS agents attempt to escape with Wilby via helicopter, Shack and the villagers bring down and destroy the helicopter, kill the pilot and all the BOSS agents with the exception of Major Horn, and free Wilby. Horn is disarmed of his pistol and taken prisoner, where he gloats that he will be rescued by the South African Government and that he will continue to pursue them. Jim responds by killing Horn, shooting him with his own pistol.

== Cast ==
- Sidney Poitier as Shack Twala
- Michael Caine as Jim Keogh
- Nicol Williamson as Major Horn, South African Bureau of State Security
- Prunella Gee as Rina van Niekerk
- Saeed Jaffrey as Dr. Anil Mukarjee, Indian dentist
- Persis Khambatta as Dr. Persis Ray, dentist
- Rijk de Gooyer as Van Heerden, Bureau of State Security
- Rutger Hauer as Blane van Niekerk
- Patrick Allen as The Brigadier
- Joe De Graft as Wilby Xaba
- Archie Duncan as Gordon
- Helmut Dantine as prosecuting counsel

== Reception ==
The Monthly Film Bulletin wrote: "Ralph Nelson seems to have become a main contender for the mantle of liberal polemicist, still held in the somewhat atrophied grasp of Stanley Kramer. To date, he has added little to the genre but an evident relish for exploitative chunks of violence, and if The Wilby Conspiracy is less disreputable than Soldier Blue in this respect, it has similar failings in many others: a careless way of chopping between the scenes of political message-mongering and the crudely engineered boosts of the action; a rough, schematic kind of dialogue whenever characters declare themselves on the issues, a flip, bantering, comedy-thriller style of delivery elsewhere ...The Wilby Conspiracy is so negligible as a political drama mainly because as a thriller it is reduced to the level of a Biggles adventure."

== DVD & HD ==
- The region 1 DVD was released 20 January 2004.
- In 2010 it was digitized in High Definition (1080i) and broadcast on MGM HD.
