= Stephen Collins (journalist) =

Irish journalist and writer

Stephen Collins, an Irish journalist and author, is a columnist with The Irish Times having served as political editor of the newspaper from 2006 until 2017. He previously covered politics for the The Irish Press, The Sunday Press and the Sunday Tribune. He joined the The Irish Times. in January 2006, under the editorship of the former Progressive Democrats T.D., Geraldine Kennedy. He earned a B.A. in History and Politics and an M.A. in politics at University College Dublin.

Collins has written a number of books about Irish political history including including, The Cosgrave Legacy (1996), Power Game: Ireland Under Fianna Fail, (2002), Breaking the Mould: How the PDs changed Irish Politics (2006) and Saving the State: Fine Gael from Collins to Varadkar (2020) written jointly with historian Ciara Meehan. His most recent book is Ireland’s Call: How Brexit Got Done (2024).

His father Willie Collins (1916–2006) was a journalist with the Irish Press and was deputy editor of The Sunday Press, and Stephen is the older brother of Sunday Independent journalist Liam Collins.
