= Tony Corcoran =

- Born: Ireland
- Occupation: Writer
- Writing career
- Notable work: The Goodness of Guinness
- Website: www.libertiespress.com/cartage.html?main_page=product_book_info&products_id=14&zenid=7j5qflq6r0fm3buarm16rjbni4&cartage_alias=cartage

Tony Corcoran is an Irish writer. He is the author of The Goodness of Guinness, a book which examines the brewery's operation and the working lives of the thousands of Dublin people who depended on Guinness for their livelihood. He previously spent 38 years working in Guinness.

== Life and career ==
Corcoran's grandparents joined Guinness in 1891, and his father started working for the company in 1924. Tony himself spent thirty-eight years in Guinness, working in the highly specialised brewing area. He later took on a growing responsibility for staff training, becoming brewing training manager. On retiring from the company in 1996, he set out to mine the company's extensive archive in order to chart the history of the James's Gate Brewery and, in particular, Guinness's progressive approach to staff welfare.

== Works ==
The Goodness of Guinness: The Brewery, Its People and the City of Dublin was published in 2005 by Liberties Press and is the first illustrated social history of St James's Gate Brewery. It includes in-depth discussions of the major contribution made by the Guinness company to the welfare of its staff and the wider community. The introduction is written by Finbarr Flood, a former director of Guinness and author of In Full Flood.
