= Hugh Lambert =

Irish journalist

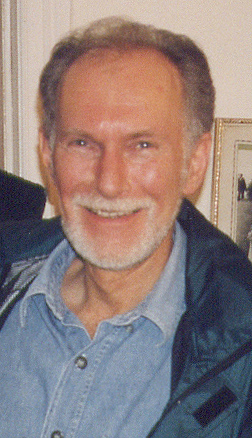
Hugh Lambert

Hugh Lambert (27 May 1944 – 26 December 2005) was an Irish journalist.

He began his career with the Evening Press and Sunday Press in 1962 as sub-editor. From 1971 to 1980, he was a film critic for the Sunday Press, when he became production editor of the paper. He was appointed editor of The Irish Press in 1987. The paper ceased publication on 25 May 1995. Lambert was married to his wife, Angela, and had four sons. Until his death, after a short illness, he worked with The Irish Times in charge of production on special reports.
