= Fionnbar Callanan =

Irish sports photographer and journalist

- Born: Ireland
- Occupations: Photographer; Journalist
- Writing career
- Notable work: A Sporting Eye

Fionnbar Callanan is an Irish sports photographer and journalist.

== Life and work ==
Fionnbar Callanan wrote on sports since 1954 for the Irish Independent, the Irish Times, Radio Éireann (as it then was) and the Irish Press. In 1960 his first sports photograph was published. Since then, his photographs have regularly been seen at home & abroad in newspapers & magazines, in sports books and even on stamps. Callanan has not just hidden behind his camera. As an athlete, he represented Ireland and has also been active in athletic and sporting bodies including BLE. He is currently Secretary of the Irish Association of Sports Journalists.

His book of sporting photography, A Sporting Eye, was published by Liberties Press in 2005.
