= Don Conroy =

Irish street artist, media personality, author and environmentalist

- Other names: "Uncle Don", " The Don", ”Banksy”
- Education: Oatlands College and Life drawings and culture at the National College of Art and Design
- Occupations: Artist, environmentalist, writer, television personality
- Known for: Preserving wildlife, his slots on The Den during which he would teach the children of Ireland how to draw. Notabale street art around UK and Ireland.
- Children: 5
- Website: https://donconroy.com/

Don Conroy is an Irish street artist, environmentalist, television personality and writer of children's literature. His artistic and literary work focuses on natural themes, including wildlife. He works for wildlife conservation in Ireland and made regular appearances on The Den since it began in 1986, becoming the longest continually serving member of the cast.

== Early life and education ==
Don Conroy grew up in Donnybrook, Dublin, near Herbert Park. He has four siblings. He attended Oatlands College, a Christian Brothers school in Stillorgan. He was encouraged by his mother and extended family to draw. Conroy studied at the National College of Art and Design and then worked as designer and illustrator for advertising agencies as well as in the theatre. He was in amateur dramatic productions with the Lantern Theatre and the Guinness Players, and was awarded a diploma from The Royal Irish Academy in Speech and Drama. He appeared as an extra in a number of films in the 1970s and 1980s, including The Big Red One.

== Career ==
Conroy made his first appearance on Irish television in 1982 on the Late Late Show, going on to present his own show, Paint For Fun. From 1986 Conroy made regular appearances on The Den, becoming the longest continually serving member of the cast. He has also appears publicly, at libraries, schools and elsewhere, where he entertains children with stories and drawings of various animals, in much the same capacity as his role on The Den. After The Den, Conroy hosted his own show again, The Art of Don. One of his favourite animals is the barn owl. Conroy appeared at Electric Picnic giving art classes. In 2020, Conroy restarted Draw with Don as a YouTube channel in response to the COVID-19 social restrictions in Ireland.

=== Conservation ===
Conroy played a part in the project to reintroduce the golden eagle to Ireland, was involved in establishing a sanctuary for whales and dolphins in Irish waters, and other events highlighting issues relating to endangered animals and habitats such as World Curlew Day 2020. He is an honorary member and patron of the Irish Peatland Conservation Council.

== Selected writing ==
- Wings trilogy: On Silent Wings, Wild Wings and Sky Wings
- Cartoon Fun with Don Conroy
- Vampire Journal
- What the Owl Saw
- The Fox's Tale
- Joey's Big Day
- The Bookworm Who Turned Over a New Leaf
- Elephant at the Door

== Family ==
Conroy and his wife Gay have five children, and has a home in County Wexford, near Enniscorthy.
