= Henry Berry =

Henry Berry may refer to:

- Henry Berry (engineer) (1719–1812), English dock engineer
- Henry Berry (politician) (1883–1956), British Labour party member of parliament for Woolwich West 1945–1950
- Henry Berry (rugby union) (1883–1915), English rugby union player
- Henry Berry Lowry (c. 1845–after 1872), American outlaw
- Henry Seymour Berry, 1st Baron Buckland (1877–1928), Welsh industrialist
- Sir Henry Vaughan Berry (1891–1979), financier and military administrator

== See also ==
- W. H. Berry (1870–1951), an English comic actor
- Henry Barry (disambiguation)
