= Michael Carwood =

Michael Carwood, was an Irish sports journalist, musician and songwriter.

Born in Dublin in 1948, he was educated at Dundrum National School and Oatlands College in Dublin.

In 1968, he started working for The Irish Press, becoming a journalist, and becoming sports editor of The Sunday Press in 1988.

Following the closure of The Irish Press, he worked freelance for the Irish Independent and The Irish Times, and also lectured in journalism at the Dublin Institute of Technology.

A musician who played keyboards and sang with Showbands such as The Gnumps and The Others, with Ronan Collins. He wrote the song The Boys in Green the official song of Irish European Championship team in 1988. Another song he wrote She is mine which entered the Irish charts for The Others, as well as Why must they die and If you go away.

He died aged 54 on 2 October 2002, in Greystones, County Wicklow.
