= Fiona McPhillips =

Irish journalist and crime fiction writer

Fiona McPhillips is an Irish journalist and crime fiction writer. She graduated from Dublin City University. In 2021, she was highly commended for the Crime Writers' Association's Debut Dagger. Her debut novel, When We Were Silent, was shortlisted for the Irish Independent Crime Fiction Book of the Year at the 2024 Irish Book Awards.

McPhillips has three children.

== Works ==
- McPhillips, Fiona (2018-03-26). Make the Home You Love. O'Brien Press. ISBN 978-1-84717-957-9.
- McPhillips, Fiona (2024-05-21). When We Were Silent. ISBN 978-1-250-90823-0.
