= Steve Conway (writer) =

Irish broadcaster

Steve Conway is an Irish radio broadcaster and writer from Dublin. He formerly worked at the offshore pirate radio station Radio Caroline, later on the Dublin indie rock station Phantom 105.2, and most recently 8Radio, an online station operated by Phantom founder Simon Maher.

== Career ==
=== Radio ===
Conway started his radio career on a small London rock-music pirate, South East Sound, in 1985, before moving to Radio Caroline, where he rose to the positions of Head of News and Programme Controller. Initially, when he started for the first time on Radio Caroline, Conway's sole function was as a newsreader. In 1991 he was one of the final crew on board the Caroline ship Ross Revenge when it ran aground on the Goodwin Sands. In 1999, he returned to help relaunch Radio Caroline on satellite, moving home to Dublin and taking up a position the following year on Phantom, which at the time was a pirate.

Conway had also involvement with at least two other pirates during the 1990s and the early 2000s - Radio Dublin and ABC Dublin. He was Head of News during Phantom's two temporary license runs in 2003 and 2004. His main show on Phantom 105.2, when it was on a full-time license, was Random Access on Sunday evenings.

Conway also got involved in 2010 with a licensed Dutch radio station called Radio Seagull. He worked once again with his brother Chris, who had previously worked with him in the late 1980s on Radio Caroline. Since 2013, Conway has worked at the online station 8Radio on a number of temporary-licensed runs on FM radio between 2013 and 2018, covering Dublin, Cork and Limerick. For most of his time with 8Radio, Conway has presented a long-running series called "A to Z of Great Tracks", both online and on FM.

=== Writing ===
In 2009 Liberties Press published Conway's memoir, Shiprocked: Life on the Waves with Radio Caroline (ISBN 978-1-905483-62-4) which details his involvement with Radio Caroline in its final years at sea (1987–91) and briefly covers the relaunch of the station on satellite in 1998/9. A revised edition of Shiprocked was published in November 2014.

Conway has also had a short story "Old Haunts" published in a 2008 anthology of Irish writing, Census (ISBN 978-0-9555346-7-6), and has also contributed feature articles to the Irish music magazine Hot Press.

=== Other work ===
Conway works in the I.T. industry.

== Personal life ==
He resides in County Westmeath in Ireland.
