= Harry Barry =

Irish writer and doctor

- Occupations: Doctor, writer
- Writing career
- Notable works: Flagging the Problem, Flagging the Therapy

Harry Barry is an Irish author and medical doctor based in County Louth. He has a particular interest in the area of mental health and has extensive experience in his practice of dealing with issues such as depression, addiction and anxiety. He has written numerous articles for The Irish Independent and eleven books.

== Career ==
Barry retired from being a full-time GP in 2013 to focus on mental health. He is now a mental-health consultant, as well as a writer and media and public information lecturer.

== Publications ==
Books

- Barry, Harry and Murphy, Edna (2014). Flagging the Screenager: Guiding Your Child Through Adolescence and Young Adulthood. Dublin: Liberties Press. ISBN 978-1909718265.
- Barry, Harry (2017). Anxiety and Panic: How to reshape your anxious mind and brain (The Flag Series). London: Orion Spring. ISBN 978-1409174516.
- Barry, Harry (2017). Depression: A Practical Guide. London: Orion Spring. ISBN 9781409174493.
- Barry, Harry (2017). Flagging the Problem: A new approach to mental health (The Flag Series). London: Orion Spring. ISBN 978-1409174455.
- Barry, Harry (2017). Flagging the Therapy: Pathways out of depression and anxiety (The Flag Series). London: Orion Spring. ISBN 978-1409174431.
- Barry, Harry (2017). Toxic Stress: A step-by-step guide to managing stress (The Flag Series). London: Orion Spring. ISBN 978-1409174479.
- Barry, Harry (2018). Emotional Resilience: How to safeguard your mental health (The Flag Series). London: Orion Spring. ISBN 978-1409174578.
- Barry, Harry (2019). Self–Acceptance: How to banish the self-esteem myth, accept yourself unconditionally and revolutionise your mental health. London: Orion Spring. ISBN 978-1409188551.
- Barry, Harry (2020). Emotional Healing: How To Put Yourself Back Together Again. London: Orion Spring. ISBN 978-1409188582.
- Barry, Harry (2021). Embracing Change: How to build resilience and make change work for you. London: Orion Spring. ISBN 9781409199892.
- Barry, Harry (2023). The Power of Connection: Change your relationships, transform your life. London: Orion Spring. ISBN 978-1409199915.

=== External links ===
- Liberties Press The author's page at Liberties Press.
