= Dave Kavanagh =

Irish hurler

Personal information
- Native name: Daithí Caomhánach (Irish)
- Nickname: Davy
- Born: 1 March 1887 Ballylucas, County Wexford, Ireland
- Died: 5 August 1965 (aged 78) Garryhubbock, County Wexford, Ireland
- Occupation: Farmer

Sport
- Sport: Hurling
- Position: Forward
Club
- Years: Club
- Castlebridge
Club titles
- Wexford titles: 2
Inter-county
- Years: County
- Wexford
Inter-county titles
- Leinster titles: 2
- All-Irelands: 1

David Kavanagh (1 March 1887 – 5 August 1965) was an Irish hurler. His championship career with the Wexford team spanned the first two decades of the 20th century.

Kavanagh was born in Ballylucas, County Wexford to the former Mary Murphy and John Kavanagh. After a brief education he spent his working life as a farmer. Kavanagh first played competitive hurling with the Castlebridge club. Throughout his club career he won two county senior championship medals.

After impressing on the club scene, Kavanagh was quickly added to the Wexford inter-county team. He won his only All-Ireland medal in 1910. Kavanagh had earlier won a Leinster medal before winning a second winners' medal in 1918.

Kavanagh died on 5 August 1965 aged 78.

== Honours ==
Castlebridge

- Wexford Senior Hurling Championship (2): 1910, 1919

Wexford

- All-Ireland Senior Hurling Championship (1): 1910
- Leinster Senior Hurling Championship (2): 1910, 1918
