= Stephen Conway (cricketer) =

English cricketer (born 1974)

Personal information
- Full name: Stephen Lawrence John Conway
- Born: 15 November 1974 (age 51); Stockton-on-Tees, County Durham, England
- Batting: Left-handed
- Bowling: Right-arm medium

Domestic team information
- Years: Team
- 1999: Oxford University

Career statistics
Competition	First-class
Matches	1
Runs scored	0
Batting average	–
100s/50s	–/–
Top score	0*
Balls bowled	84
Wickets	0
Bowling average	–
5 wickets in innings	–
10 wickets in match	–
Best bowling	–
Catches/stumpings	–/–
- Source: Cricinfo, 6 February 2020

Stephen Lawrence John Conway (born 15 November 1974) is an English university manager and former first-class cricketer.

Conway was born at Stockton-on-Tees in November 1974. He studied chemistry at Jesus College, Oxford and completed a doctorate with Professor Malcolm Green. While at Oxford, he made a single appearance in first-class cricket for Oxford University against Essex at Chelmsford in 1999. Conway has held a number of senior roles in university management including at the University of Oxford and the Open University. He became a fellow of Jesus College, Oxford and in 2018 he was appointed to the post of executive director of Research Services at the University of Oxford.
