= Tom Curran (hurler) =

Irish hurler (1920–2005)

Personal information
- Native name: Tomás Ó Corráin (Irish)
- Born: 1920 Dungarvan, County Waterford, Ireland
- Died: June 2005 (aged 84–85) Dungarvan, County Waterford, Ireland
- Occupation: Hardware store owner
- Height: 5 ft 11 in (180 cm)

Sport
- Sport: Hurling
- Position: Left corner-forward
Club
- Years: Club
- Dungarvan
Club titles
	Football	Hurling
Waterford titles	5	1
Inter-county
- Years: County
- Waterford
Inter-county titles
- Munster titles: 1
- All-Irelands: 1
- NHL: 0

Tom Curran (1920 - June 2005) was an Irish hurler who played as a left corner-forward for the Waterford senior team.

Born in Dungarvan, County Waterford, Curran first played competitive hurling in his youth. After enjoying success as a Gaelic footballer with the Waterford junior team, he subsequently became a regular member of the Waterford senior hurling team. Curran went on to win one All-Ireland medal and one Munster medal.

At club level Curran was a six-time championship medallist with Dungarvan as a dual player.

== Honours ==
=== Team ===
Dungarvan

- Waterford Senior Hurling Championship (1): 1941
- Waterford Senior Football Championship (5): 1945, 1946, 1947, 1948, 1954

Waterford

- All-Ireland Senior Hurling Championship (1): 1948
- Munster Senior Hurling Championship (1): 1948
