= Peter Driscoll (author) =

Irish author (1942–2005)

Peter Driscoll (4 February 1942 – 30 October 2005) was a bestselling Irish author of international thrillers in the 1970s who first worked in South Africa then, in his later life, became Chief Radio News subeditor with Raidió Teilifís Éireann. He died of a heart attack.

== Published works ==
- The White Lie Assignment (1971), set in Albania.
- The Wilby Conspiracy (1972), set in South Africa. The novel has been adapted into an eponymous movie in 1975.
- In Connection with Kilshaw (1974), set in Ireland.
- The Barboza Credentials (1976), set in Mozambique.
- Pangolin (1979), set in Hong Kong.
- Heritage (1982), set in Algeria.
- Spearhead (1987), set in South Africa.
- Secrets of State (1992), set in the United States.
- Spoils of War (1994), set in Iraq.
