= The Sunday Press =

Irish newspaper (1949–1995)

- Front page of first issue
- Type: Sunday newspaper
- Format: Broadsheet
- Owner: The Irish Press
- Editor: Matt Feehan (1949–1968), Francis Carty (1968), Vincent Jennings (1968–1986); Michael Keane (1986-1995)
- Founded: 4 September 1949
- Ceased publication: 1995
- Political alignment: Irish nationalism; Irish republicanism
- Headquarters: Burgh Quay, Dublin

The Sunday Press was a weekly newspaper published in Ireland from 1949 until 1995. It was launched by Éamon de Valera's Irish Press group following the defeat of his Fianna Fáil party in the 1948 Irish general election. Like its sister newspaper, the daily The Irish Press, politically the paper loyally supported Fianna Fáil.

The future Taoiseach Seán Lemass was the managing editor of the Irish Press who spearheaded the launch of the Sunday paper, with the first editor Colonel Matt Feehan. Many of the Irish Press journalists contributed to the paper. 'When I open the pages, I duck' was Brendan Behan's description of reading The Sunday Press, for the habit of published memoirs of veterans (usually those aligned to Fianna Fáil) of the Irish War of Independence.

It soon built up a large readership, and overtook its main competitor the Sunday Independent, which tended to support Fine Gael. At its peak The Sunday Press sold up to 475,000 copies every week, and had a readership of over one million, around one third of the Irish population.

Like the Evening Press, the paper's readership held up better over the years than that of the flagship title in the group, The Irish Press, and it might have survived as a stand-alone title had it been sold. However, with the collapse of the Irish Press Newspapers group in May 1995, all three titles ceased publication immediately. The launch of Ireland on Sunday in 1997 was initially interpreted by many observers as an attempt to appeal to the former readership of The Sunday Press, seen as generally rural, fairly conservative Catholic, and with a traditional Irish nationalist political outlook.

When Christmas Day fell on Sunday in 1949, 1955, 1960, 1966, 1977, 1983, 1988 and 1994 the paper came out on the Saturday.

Vincent Jennings at the age of 31 became editor of The Sunday Press in 1968, serving until December 1986, when he became manager of the Irish Press Group. Journalists who worked at the press include Stephen Collins served as political editor his father Willie Collins was deputy editor and Michael Carwood became sports editor of The Sunday Press in 1988 until its closure in 1995.

== Digital archive ==
The Sunday Press from 1978 to 1989 was added to the Irish Newspaper Archives in September 2020. (1990–1995) issues went online in May 2024.
