= Evening Press =

Irish newspaper

The Evening Press
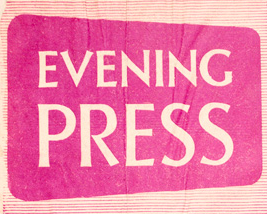

- Front page of the Evening Press, 1 September 1954
- Type: Evening newspaper
- Format: broadsheet
- Owner: Irish Press Ltd.
- Editor: Sean Ward; Richard O'Riordan; Matt Farrell, deputy editor; Sean Cronin, sub editor
- Founded: 1954
- Ceased publication: 1995
- Political alignment: Irish Nationalism; Irish Republicanism
- Headquarters: Burgh Quay, Dublin

The Evening Press was an Irish newspaper which was printed from 1954 until 1995. It was set up by Éamon de Valera's Irish Press group, and was originally edited by Douglas Gageby. Its principal competitor was the Evening Herald, which had been operating in Dublin as the one of only two evening papers since the demise of the Evening Telegraph in 1924.

The Evening Press was an instant success, and contributed to the financial losses and eventual closure of the Evening Mail in 1962. The Evening Press heavily outsold the Evening Herald for most of its life also, particularly outside Dublin. It peaked at sales of 175,000 copies a day.

The poor performance of The Irish Press, particularly after its unsuccessful relaunch in 1988, was a severe drain on the whole Irish Press Group, and probably damaged the Evening Press brand, although it continued to perform better in the evening newspaper market than its sister paper did in the morning market. It retained a loyal following due in part to the popularity of columnists such as sports writer Con Houlihan, although it struggled to generate advertising revenue. It also featured the prolific cartoonist, Till (George O'Callaghan) who published nearly 10,000 cartoons in the paper between 1956 and 1992.

Other journalists who worked for the paper were the award-winning journalist and author Clare Boylan, Seán Cronin (sub editor), Matt Farrell (deputy editor) who also went under the pseudonym Sir Ivor with racing tips, Ed Moloney, the financial journalist Des Crowley, Sean McCann, former senator John Horgan and Vincent Browne.

The collapse of Irish Press Newspapers in 1995, however, led immediately to the closure of all three newspapers in the group.

Editors included Douglas Gageby (1954–1959), Conor O'Brien (1959–1970), Sean Ward (1970–1992) and Richard O'Riordan who was the newspaper's final editor.

With the demise of the Evening Press in the 1990s, the Evening Herald became the only nationwide Irish evening newspaper. It later changed its name to The Herald, dropping its status as an evening paper.

== Digital archive ==
The newspaper was made online via Irish Newspaper Archives on July 29, 2020.
