= Patricia Scanlon =

Irish entrepreneur

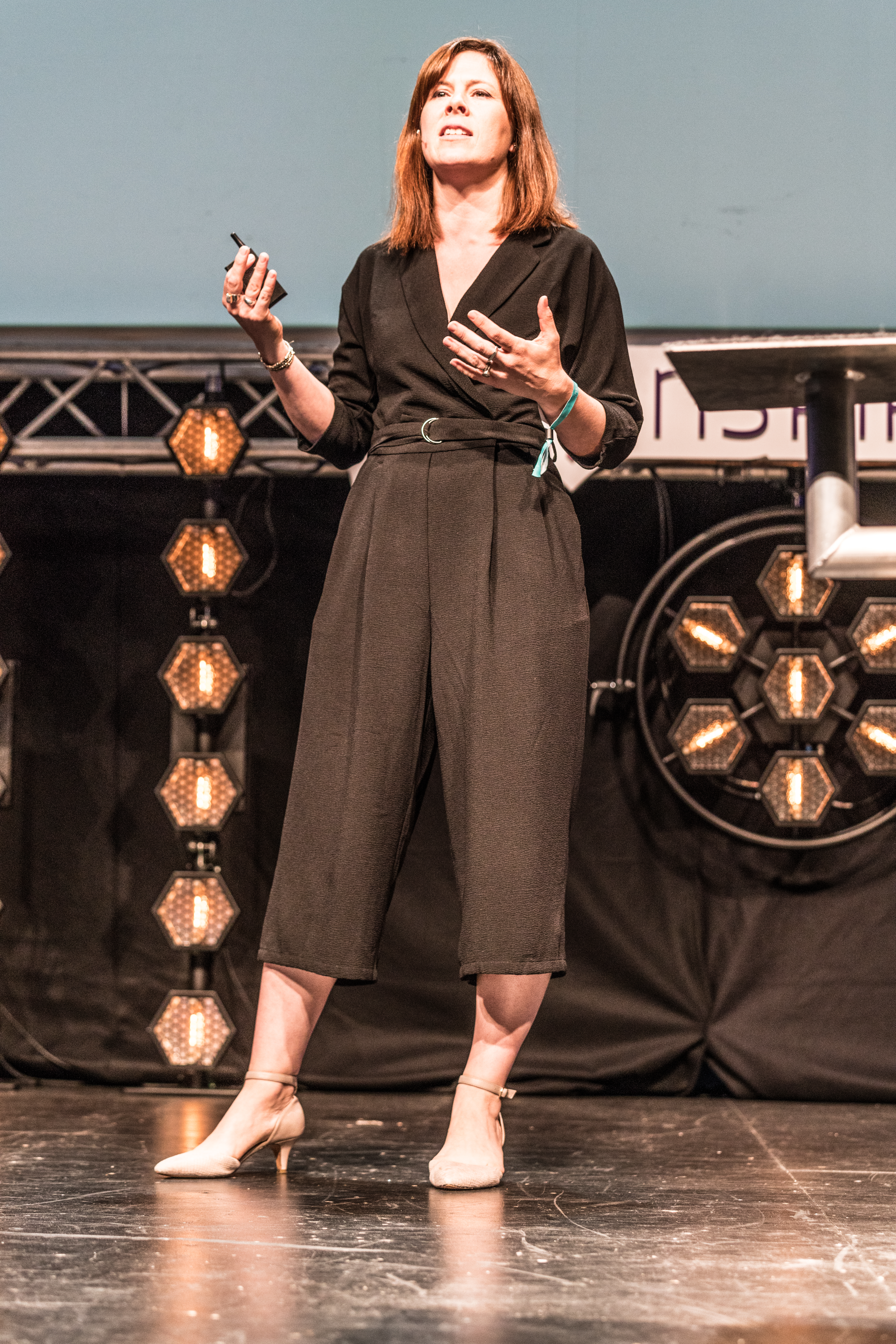
Patricia Scanlon at Inspirefest, 2017, Dublin

Patricia Scanlon (born 1974 or 1975) is an Irish technologist and businesswoman. She founded SoapBox Labs in 2013, a company that applies artificial intelligence to develop speech recognition applications that are specifically tuned to children's voices. Scanlon was CEO of SoapBox Labs from its founding until May 2021, when she became executive chair. In 2022, Scanlon was appointed by the Irish Government as Ireland’s first Artificial Intelligence Ambassador. In this role, she will "lead a national conversation" about the role of AI in people's lives, including its benefits and risks.

== Early life and education ==
Scanlon grew up in the town of Naas, County Kildare, where her father worked for a building provider and her mother was a town councillor.

Scanlon completed a bachelor's degree in electronic engineering at the Dublin Institute of Technology in 1997 and then completed a PhD from University College Dublin in digital signal processing for speech recognition in 2005. She did two years of research at Columbia University in New York, then six months of research at IBM in Dublin.

== Career ==
Scanlon worked as a software engineer at Accuris, a Dublin tech firm, with short stints in both Holland and Australia. After completing her PhD, she worked at Bell Labs in Dublin on projects in immersive communications, e-health and acoustic signalling.

Scanlon founded SoapBox Labs in 2013, after noting that most speech recognition technology was built for adults and didn't work as well for kids who have higher pitched voices and different speech patterns and who don't tend to modify their speech when interacting with AI. She received backing from Enterprise Ireland and Astia Angels members and worked out of Trinity College Dublin's incubation centre from 2014 until 2016. SoapBox used thousands of hours of audio of children aged 2-12 from 192 countries in real-world noisy environments to create its own dataset. By 2021, the company had raised over $US12 million in funding, including a 1,5 million euro grant by EU SME in 2017. The technology has been used in a range of toy and education apps. In 2018 the technology was available in Mandarin, Spanish and Portuguese and later in 2019 in French, German and Italian.

In May 2021, Scanlon stepped down as CEO of SoapBox, becoming executive chair while Martyn Farrows, the company's former COO, became CEO.

Scanlon has spoken at conferences including Inspirefest in 2017, SXSW EDU in 2021, and the Women in Tech Global Conference in 2022. In 2019, she gave a TEDx talk at the University of Limerick on "How Technology Transforms a Child’s Reading Journey".

In 2022, Scanlon was appointed as the first Artificial Intelligence Ambassador by the Irish Government. Scanlon's appointment was announced by Minister of State Robert Troy after an open expression of interest call and assessment process. Scanlon's role is to lead a national conversation about the place, benefits, and risks of AI, working with the Department of Enterprise, Trade and Employment. Troy said he hoped Ireland could become "a leader in advocating for and adopting an ethical approach to AI, that puts humans first."

== Awards and recognition ==
In October 2018, Scanlon was listed by Forbes as one of the top 50 Women in Tech in Europe and one of the top 50 Women in Tech worldwide.

In 2020, Scanlon was listed #6 by Voicebot.ai as a top Visionary in Voice, in a list topped by Jeff Bezos. In 2021, Scanlon was named a finalist of the EU Prize for Women Innovators, a prize that honours the most talented women entrepreneurs from across Europe and is managed by the European Innovation Council.

== Selected publications ==
- Scanlon, Patricia; Reilly, R (2001). "Feature analysis for automatic speechreading". 2001 IEEE Fourth Workshop on Multimedia Signal Processing (Cat. No.01TH8564). pp. 625–630. doi:10.1109/MMSP.2001.962802. ISBN 0-7803-7025-2. S2CID 7544312.
- Scanlon, Patricia; Ellis, Daniel PW; Reilly, Richard B (2007). "Using broad phonetic group experts for improved speech recognition". IEEE Transactions on Audio, Speech, and Language Processing. 15 (3). IEEE: 803–812. Bibcode:2007ITASL..15..803S. doi:10.1109/TASL.2006.885907. hdl:2262/17559. S2CID 2665820.
- Kennedy, Irwin O; Scanlon, Patricia; Mullany, Francis J; Buddhikot, Milind M; Nolan, Keith E; Rondeau, Thomas W (2008). "Radio Transmitter Fingerprinting: A Steady State Frequency Domain Approach". 2008 IEEE 68th Vehicular Technology Conference. IEEE. pp. 1–5. doi:10.1109/VETECF.2008.291. hdl:2262/29906. ISBN 978-1-4244-1721-6. S2CID 13174542.
- Scanlon, Patricia; Kennedy, Irwin O; Liu, Yongheng (2010). "Feature extraction approaches to RF fingerprinting for device identification in femtocells". Bell Labs Technical Journal. 15 (3). Wiley Subscription Services, Inc.: 141–151. doi:10.1002/bltj.20462. S2CID 32906046.
- Scanlon, Patricia; Kavanagh, Darren F; Boland, Francis M (2012). "Residual life prediction of rotating machines using acoustic noise signals". IEEE Transactions on Instrumentation and Measurement. 62 (1). IEEE: 95–108. doi:10.1109/TIM.2012.2212508. S2CID 9778101.

== Personal life ==
Scanlon is married with two children.
