= 2005 Kuşadası minibus bombing =

Bombing in Kuşadası, Turkey

Kuşadası bus bombing
- Location: Kuşadası, Turkey
- Date: 16 July 2005
- Target: Civilian passenger/tourist minibus
- Attack type: Bombing
- Deaths: 5
- Injuries: 14

Kuşadası minibus bombing occurred on July 16, 2005, when a minibus carrying locals and tourists to the town's famous "Ladies Beach" exploded in Kuşadası, Turkey. Five people, four women and one man, were killed in the blast.

The Kurdish group PKK was initially suspected of carrying out the bombing but they denied being involved in the attack. A suspect was arrested in Istanbul on 8 April 2006.

== Victims ==
Casualties included three Turkish nationals: Deniz Tutum (21), a native of Kuşadası on her way to work, Eda Okyay and Ufuk Yücedeniz, both 23 and fiancées on a weekend excursion from İzmir, and two tourists: Helyn Bennett (21), of County Durham, England and Tara Whelan (17), of Waterford, Ireland. A total of fourteen people were injured, eight Turks and six British tourists. Seven people, including all but one of the British citizens, had their conditions judged serious enough to be transported to Ege University hospital in İzmir.

Deniz Tutum's funeral in Kuşadası was transformed into a mass gathering of which moving accounts were made. Tara Whelan's funeral in her hometown as well as the aftermath for all concerned was covered with emphasis by the national media in Ireland. A commemoration service was held for Helyn Bennett, along with other British bombing victims of 2005, in Southwark Cathedral.

The cases of Helyn Bennett and of members of her family, several of whom were wounded in the same attack, were cited as examples during the process that led to the establishment in the United Kingdom in 2007 of a statutory fund through the Red Cross for overseas victims of terrorism; a previously existing scheme managed by the Criminal Injuries Compensation Authority making criminal injuries payments for UK attacks only.

== See also ==
- 2010 Hakkâri bus attack
