= The Irish Press =

Irish newspaper (1931–1995)

- Cover of last edition from 25 May 1995
- Type: Daily newspaper
- Format: Broadsheet (1931–1988); Compact (1988–1995)
- Owners: Irish Press Ltd.; Éamon de Valera
- Founder: Éamon de Valera
- Editor: Frank Gallagher (1931–1935); John N Herlihy (1935–1938); William Sweetman (1938–1950); Jim McGuinness (1953–1957); Tim Pat Coogan (1968–1987); Hugh Lambert (1988–1995)
- Founded: 5 September 1931
- Ceased publication: 25 May 1995
- Political alignment: Nationalist / Republican; Pro-Fianna Fáil
- Language: English, Irish
- Headquarters: Burgh Quay, Dublin

The Irish Press (Irish: Scéala Éireann) was an Irish national daily newspaper published by Irish Press plc between 5 September 1931 and 25 May 1995.

== History ==
=== Foundation ===
The paper's first issue was published on the eve of the 1931 All-Ireland Senior Hurling Championship Final between Kilkenny and Cork; other newspapers did not cover Gaelic games in any detail at the time. Margaret Pearse, the mother of Padraig and Willie Pearse, pressed the button to start the printing presses. The initial aim of its publisher was to achieve a circulation of 100,000 which it quickly accomplished. It went on to list a subscribership of 200,000 at its peak. Irish Press Ltd. was officially registered on 4 September 1928, three years before the paper was first published, to create a newspaper independent of the existing media where the Independent Newspapers group was seen as supporting Cumann na nGaedheal/Fine Gael, and The Irish Times being pro-union, and with a mainly middle-class or Protestant readership. The Irish Press founder Éamon de Valera said the paper's objective was: "To give the truth in the news, that will be the chief aim of The Irish Press. The Irish Press will be a truthful journal and a good newspaper". The founders planned to produce an evening and Sunday edition of the paper if the daily was successful, and they did.

=== Initial financing ===
The money to launch The Irish Press was raised in the United States during the Irish War of Independence by a bond drive to finance the First Dáil. The amount raised was $5 million ($55 million adjusted for inflation as of 2011). However, 60 percent of this money was left in various banks in New York. Nobody has been able to explain why Éamon de Valera ordered the bulk of the money to be left in New York when he returned to Ireland in late 1920. In 1927, as a result of legal action between the Irish Free State government and de Valera, a court in New York ordered that the bond holders be paid back outstanding money due to them. However, de Valera's legal team had anticipated the ruling and had prepared for the outcome. A number of circulars were sent to the bond holders asking them to sign over their holdings to de Valera. The bond holders were paid 58 cents to the dollar. This money was then used as start up capital to launch The Irish Press. Following the 1933 Irish General Election de Valera used his Dáil majority to pass a measure allowing the bond holders to be paid the remaining 42 percent of the money still owed.

=== 1930s/1940s ===
In December 1931, the editor Frank Gallagher was prosecuted by an Irish Free State military tribunal for publishing articles alleging that Gardaí had mistreated the opponents (Anti-Treaty republicans) of the Irish Free State government. This was facilitated by Amendment No. 17 of Constitution of the Irish Free State and Gallagher was convicted and fined £50. An example of animosity from those who supported Independent Newspapers and the Free State government was that The Irish Press was excluded from the special train which delivered newspapers from Dublin to the countryside.

During "The Emergency" (World War II), the Irish Directorate of Military Intelligence was concerned that The Irish Press had too many left-wing republicans as part of its staff. The Irish Press' staff at that time included R. M. Fox, Maire Comerford, Brian O'Neill, Geoffrey Coulter, and Tom Mullins.

=== Section 31 and the Troubles ===
In the 1970s, the Minister for Posts and Telegraphs, Conor Cruise O'Brien, tried to use and amend The Emergency Powers Act and Section 31 of the Broadcasting Authority Act, to censor coverage of the Troubles in Northern Ireland. The Press editor, Tim Pat Coogan, published editorials attacking the Bill.

The Fine Gael/Labour Coalition Government tried to prosecute The Irish Press for its coverage of the maltreatment of republican prisoners by the Garda "Heavy Gang", with the paper winning the case.

=== Final days ===
The final issue of the Irish Press and Evening Press was on Thursday, 25 May 1995. The newspapers closed ostensibly because of a bizarre industrial dispute over the sacking of the group business editor, Colm Rapple, but in fact, the company was insolvent with accumulated losses of €19m and the company applied to liquidate with a few days of the dispute starting. The group had not been in a healthy financial state for several years. When it eventually closed, with indebtedness of £19 million, 600 people lost their jobs.

A relaunch in 1988 of the Irish Press as a tabloid did not help matters. In 1989, Ralph M. Ingersoll Jr. took a 50 percent stake in Irish Press Newspapers. Several efforts were made to relaunch the newspapers but these failed.

Independent Newspapers invested £1.1 million for a 24.9 percent stake in Irish Press Newspapers and had made loans of £2 million when the titles ceased publication. It recouped £1 million arising from a charge against a loan when the Irish Press office in Burgh Quay was sold in 1996.

The final editor from 1987 to 1995, Hugh Lambert died after a short illness on 26 December 2005.

== Additional titles ==
During its lifespan, the Irish Press started two sister newspapers, the Evening Press (1954), and the Sunday Press. The Evening Press was aimed at an urban readership and achieved a daily circulation of 100,000. Terry O'Sullivan, the pen name of Tomas O'Faolain, father of writer and journalist Nuala O'Faolain, was provided with a car and driver and wrote a social column. The new newspapers subsidised The Irish Press when its circulation sagged. Its adoption of a tabloid format did not rescue its declining circulation.

Formerly one of the main daily newspapers in Ireland, The Irish Press' business failure left the ground clear for its old rivals, The Irish Times and the Irish Independent, to dominate the daily market for some years until other competitors were introduced.

== Prominent personalities ==
The newspaper was controlled by Éamon de Valera and his family, and as a consequence, it supported Fianna Fáil consistently throughout its life, expressing the "national outlook" in keeping with the thoughts and sentiments of his party supporters. The paper was aimed particularly at teachers and schools, with strong coverage of GAA games and the Irish language. Cearbhall Ó Dálaigh was the first Irish language editor. The first editor was Frank Gallagher, who fought alongside Éamon de Valera during the Irish War of Independence. Its directors included Robert Barton.

Seán Lemass was an early managing director. Major Vivion de Valera, son of the founder, subsequently became managing director. De Valera was noted for courtesy amongst those running the business, which was considered well run. Shareholders came from both Ireland and the United States. It was many years before a dividend was paid. Douglas Gageby worked on each of the press titles, The Irish Press, Evening Press (as first editor) and The Sunday Press, and subsequently was editor of The Irish Times. Tim Pat Coogan, who started working for the Evening Press, became editor of The Irish Press from 1968 until 1987. Derry-born James Patrick (Jim) McGuinness, who was editor from 1953 until 1957, brought in journalists such as Benedict Kiely, Seán J. White, and also Brendan Behan as a columnist.

Others who have written for The Irish Press include the poet Patrick Kavanagh; the broadcaster and journalist Vincent Browne, who was Northern Editor from 1970 to 1972; Damien Kiberd who was business editor; his brother, Professor Declan Kiberd, was a columnist with The Irish Press from 1987 to 1993; the Catholic and feminist campaigner and journalist Mary Kenny; sports writer and founder of GOAL John O'Shea; the novelist John Banville was Chief Sub-editor of the Irish Press - other sub-editors included the poet Hugh McFadden; the historian Dermot Keogh, and the Joycean critic Terence Killeen; T. P. O'Mahony (Religious Affairs Correspondent 1967–89); Maire Comerford; sports writer Michael Carwood; Breandán Ó hEithir (Irish Language editor 1957–1963); Dermot Walsh; Tom O'Dea (television critic 1965–1983); also the renowned sports writer Con Houlihan.

In its early days, it was circulated throughout Ireland by a specially rented train because the rival Independent Newspapers would not rent space on its train to The Irish Press. It sustained itself with its own resources until the Sunday Press was founded in the 1940s. In its heyday, The Irish Press had a number of first-rate reporters and columnists. One notable section, New Irish Writing was edited by David Marcus.

== Irish Press plc today ==
The company, Irish Press plc, remained in existence after cessation of printing of the main titles. Irish Press bought Thom's Directories for £355,000 in October 1999. The directors of the company are Éamon De Valera (grandson of the former Irish president that founded the newspaper) and Jimmy A. Lehenan. Vincent Jennings was Chairman 1992–2005. The company experienced mixed success with its Thom's Directory venture. Since getting out of the newspaper business, the company has struggled on occasion to produce profits.

The company entered voluntary liquidation in 2017 following the sale of all its remaining assets except Thoms Directory, which had ceased printing in 2012 and moved to an online directory format afterwards. No buyer was found for Thoms, which was then itself liquidated.

The Irish Press group sponsored a trophy for the All-Ireland Minor Hurling Championship in 1949, the winners ever since, being awarded the Irish Press Cup.
