= Futsal Superleague of Kosovo =

Futsal league in Kosovo

- Organising body: FFK Competitions Commission
- Founded: 2005; 21 years ago 2008; 18 years ago (refounded)
- Country: Kosovo
- Confederation: UEFA
- Number of clubs: 9
- Level on pyramid: 1
- Relegation to: First Futsal League of Kosovo
- Domestic cup: Kosovar Futsal Cup
- International cup: UEFA Futsal Champions League
- Current champions: Prishtina (1st title) (2019–20)
- Most championships: Feniks Drenas (7 titles)
- Website: www.ffk-kosova.com/superliga-futsall/

The Futsal Superleague of Kosovo (Albanian: Superliga e Futsallit të Kosovës) is the top level of the Kosovar futsal league system. The Superleague is organized by the Football Federation of Kosovo and the division currently has a 9-team format.

== Clubs (2022–23) ==
Locations of the 2022–23 Futsal Superleague of Kosovo

Note: Table lists in alphabetical order.

Club	Town	Arena
BB Llapi	Podujevo	Hakif Zejnullahu Sports Hall
Drenica & Tradita	Skenderaj	Skenderaj Competence Center's Sports Hall
Liqeni	Drenas	Drenas Sports Hall
Malisheva	Malisheva	Habib Zogaj Sports Hall
Peja	Peja	Karagaq Sports Hall
Prishtina	Pristina	Palace of Youth and Sports
Prishtina 01	Pristina	Palace of Youth and Sports
Trepça	Mitrovica	Minatori Sports Hall
Vjosa	Shtime	Shtime Sports Hall

== Kosovo futsal clubs in European competitions ==
Season	Team	Round	Opponent	Home	Away	Agg.
UEFA Futsal Cup
2016–17	Feniks	PR	(England) Oxford City Lions	3–2		
2016–17	Feniks	PR	(Andorra) Encamp (H)	12–0		
2016–17	Feniks	PR	(Israel) ASA Tel Aviv	6–0		
2016–17	Feniks	MR	(North Macedonia) Železarec Skopje (H)	5–0		
2016–17	Feniks	MR	(Azerbaijan) Araz Naxçivan	0–1		
2016–17	Feniks	MR	(Georgia (country)) Tbilisi State University	7–3		
2016–17	Feniks	ER	(Latvia) Nikars	3–4		
2016–17	Feniks	ER	(Kazakhstan) Kairat (H)	0–6		
2016–17	Feniks	ER	(Italy) Real Rieti	3–6		
2017–18	Liburni	PR	(Lithuania) Vytis	7–3		
2017–18	Liburni	PR	(Montenegro) Titograd	7–2		
2017–18	Liburni	PR	(Luxembourg) Differdange 03 (H)	6–2		
2017–18	Liburni	MR	(France) Garges Djibson	6–4		
2017–18	Liburni	MR	(Croatia) Nacional (H)	4–9		
2017–18	Liburni	MR	(Armenia) Leo	5–6		
UEFA Futsal Champions League
2018–19	Feniks (H)	MR	(Kazakhstan) Kairat	3–7		
2018–19	Feniks (H)	MR	(Belarus) Lidselmash Lida	2–3		
2018–19	Feniks (H)	MR	(Portugal) Sporting CP	0–5		
2019–20	Liburni	MR	(France) Toulon Élite	5–5		
2019–20	Liburni	MR	(Netherlands) Hovocubo	3–3		
2019–20	Liburni	MR	(Belarus) Stalitsa Minsk (H)	1–1		
2020–21	Prishtina	PR	(Albania) Tirana (H)	3–0		
2020–21	Prishtina	R32	(Spain) Barcelona (H)	2–9		
2021–22	Liqeni	PR	(Turkey) Tavşançalı	5–0		
2021–22	Liqeni	PR	(England) Helvécia	7–6		
2021–22	Liqeni	PR	(Germany) TSV Weilimdorf (H)	3–2		
2021–22	Liqeni	MR	(Romania) United Galati	6–4		
2021–22	Liqeni	MR	(Ukraine) Uragan Ivano-Frankivsk (H)	1–7		
2021–22	Liqeni	MR	(Azerbaijan) Araz Naxçivan	6–6		
2022–23	Liqeni	MR (H)	(Belarus) Stalitsa Minsk	2–6		
2022–23	Liqeni	MR (H)	(Poland) Piast Gliwice	3–9		
2022–23	Liqeni	MR (H)	(Denmark) Gentofte	4–3		
2023–24	Prishtina 01	PR	(Iceland) Ísbjörninn	11–1		
2023–24	Prishtina 01	PR	(Norway) Utleira	5–1		
2023–24	Prishtina 01	PR	(Poland) KSC Lubawa (H)	1–1		
2023–24	Prishtina 01	MR	(Finland) Kampuksen Dynamo	6–0		
2023–24	Prishtina 01	MR	(Lithuania) Kauno Žalgiris (H)	0–0		
2023–24	Prishtina 01	MR	(Cyprus) AEL Limassol	8–2		
2023–24	Prishtina 01	ER (H)	(Kazakhstan) Kairat	2–11		
2023–24	Prishtina 01	ER (H)	(Slovenia) Dobovec	3–3		
2023–24	Prishtina 01	ER (H)	(Portugal) Benfica	1–10		
2024–25	Prishtina 01	MR	(Croatia) Olmissum	2–6		
2024–25	Prishtina 01	MR	(Czech Republic) SK Plzeň	5–5		
2024–25	Prishtina 01	MR	(Portugal) SC Braga	0–5		
2025–26	Prishtina 01	MR	(Portugal) Sporting CP	1–19		
2025–26	Prishtina 01	MR	(Croatia) Vrijeme Makarska	7–6		
2025–26	Prishtina 01	MR	(Kazakhstan) Kairat	1–4		
2025–26	Prishtina 01	R16	(Latvia) Riga FC	3–3	1–8	4–11
