= Vadym Ivanov =

Ukrainian futsal player

Ivanov
Personal information
- Full name: Vadym Ivanov
- Date of birth: 15 December 1985 (age 40)
- Place of birth: Kyiv
- Position: Winger

Team information
- Current team: Red Devils Chojnice

Senior career*
Years	Team	Apps	(Gls)
2001–2005	Unisport-Budstar Kyiv	62	(29)
2005–2008	MFK Mytishchi	54	(21)
2008–2010	Viten Orsha	39	(24)
2010	MFC Lokomotiv Kharkiv		
2011	LTK Lugansk		
2011–2013	Red Devils Chojnice		(28)
2013–2014	Sportleader Khmelnitsky		
2014–	Red Devils Chojnice	6	(4)

International career
2005–2010	Ukraine	25	(11)
- * Club domestic league appearances and goals

Vadym Ivanov (Ukrainian: Вадим Валентинович Іванов; born 15 December 1985), is a Ukrainian futsal player who plays for Red Devils Chojnice and the Ukraine national futsal team. Vadym Ivanov played in Unisport-Budstar Kyiv, MFK Mytishchi, Viten Orsha, Lokomotiv Kharkiv, LTK Lugansk, Red Devils Chojnice and Sportleader Khmelnitsky. In 2009, he won Belarusian Futsal Premier League
