= 2023 UEFA Under-19 Futsal Championship squads =

The following is a list of squads for each national team competing at the 2023 UEFA Under-19 Futsal Championship.

== Group A ==
=== Croatia ===
Head coach: Duje Maretić

The final 14-men squad was revealed on 28 August 2023.

No.	Pos.	Player	Date of birth (age)	Club
1	GK	Filip Ivan Pranjić	22 December 2004 (aged 18)	(Croatia) Futsal Dinamo
4	DF	Dominik Fotak	7 October 2004 (aged 18)	(Croatia) Futsal Dinamo
5	DF	Duje Dragičević	27 August 2004 (aged 19)	(Croatia) Split
6	DF	Loren Radić	14 September 2004 (aged 18)	(Croatia) Rijeka
7	DF	Šimun Ivo Barišić	28 June 2006 (aged 17)	(Croatia) Vrgorac
8	DF	Leon Jedvaj	22 September 2004 (aged 18)	(Slovenia) Dobovec
11	DF	Josip Horvat	25 January 2004 (aged 19)	(Croatia) Aurelia
12	GK	Tin Ujević	31 August 2004 (aged 19)	(Croatia) Aurelia
13	DF	Filip Josipović	30 August 2004 (aged 19)	(Croatia) Osijek
14	FW	Bartul Ora	5 July 2004 (aged 19)	(Croatia) Šibenik 1983
17	DF	Filip Kamauli	19 November 2004 (aged 18)	(Croatia) Rijeka
18	FW	Stefano Galesić	26 September 2004 (aged 18)	(Croatia) Futsal Pula
19	DF	Karlo Vuković	29 October 2005 (aged 17)	(Croatia) Olmissum
20	DF	Martin Gudelj	23 April 2004 (aged 19)	(Croatia) Vrgorac

=== France ===
Head coach: Clément Lerebours

The final 15-men squad was revealed on 31 August 2023. Marc Bernardini is a reserve goalkeeper.

No.	Pos.	Player	Date of birth (age)	Club
1	GK	Sandro Caires	2 April 2004 (aged 19)	(France) Plaisance Pibrac Futsal
2	DF	Ayoub Asname	23 June 2005 (aged 18)	(France) Goal Futsal Club
3	DF	Tom Kolski	9 May 2006 (aged 17)	(France) Mya Futsal Essonne
5	DF	Yanis Erraddaf	21 March 2004 (aged 19)	(France) Lille Métropole Futsal
6	DF	Mamady Kouyaté	5 February 2005 (aged 18)	(France) Neuhof Futsal
7	FW	Marouane Rezzoug	3 October 2005 (aged 17)	(France) Montpellier Méditerranée Futsal
8	DF	Eliott Kolski	9 May 2006 (aged 17)	(France) Mya Futsal Essonne
9	FW	Lahcen Asname	4 February 2004 (aged 19)	(France) Goal Futsal Club
10	DF	Gora Diop	20 January 2004 (aged 19)	(France) Nantes Métropole Futsal
16	GK	Sampiero Veni	6 July 2006 (aged 17)	(France) FC Borgo
17	FW	Shawn Deshauteurs	15 November 2004 (aged 18)	(France) Cœur de Sambre Futsal
18	FW	Hakan Bulbul	31 January 2004 (aged 19)	(France) Artistes Futsal
19	FW	Simon Bugnet	24 August 2004 (aged 19)	(France) Neuhof Futsal
20	DF	Yoaquim Belaib Lemoyne	25 July 2004 (aged 19)	(France) Attainville Futsal Club

=== Portugal ===
Head coach: José Luís Mendes

The final 14-men squad was revealed on 18 August 2023.

No.	Pos.	Player	Date of birth (age)	Club
1	GK	Guilherme Cintra	2 July 2005 (aged 18)	(Portugal) Sporting CP
2	DF	Duarte Correia	17 August 2004 (aged 19)	(Portugal) Sporting CP
3	FW	Andriy Dzyalochynskyy	13 December 2005 (aged 17)	(Portugal) Burinhosa
4	DF	Bruno Maior	23 January 2004 (aged 19)	(Portugal) CR Leões Porto Salvo
5	DF	Ricardo Marques	3 June 2004 (aged 19)	(Portugal) ADCR Caxinas Poça Barca
6	DF	Rúben Carrilho	9 March 2005 (aged 18)	(Portugal) CR Leões Porto Salvo
7	FW	Lúcio Rocha	5 May 2004 (aged 19)	(Portugal) SL Benfica
8	FW	Tiago Macedo	3 July 2004 (aged 19)	(Portugal) Sporting CP
9	FW	Pedro Santos	2 February 2005 (aged 18)	(Portugal) Sporting CP
10	DF	Tomás Colaço	13 October 2004 (aged 18)	(Portugal) AD Fundão
11	FW	Diogo Silva	2 September 2004 (aged 19)	(Portugal) Sporting CP
12	GK	Diogo Carrera	6 February 2006 (aged 17)	(Portugal) SL Benfica
13	FW	Pedro Marques	19 August 2005 (aged 18)	(Portugal) SL Benfica
14	DF	Afonso Serra	27 April 2006 (aged 17)	(Portugal) SL Benfica

=== Spain ===
Head coach: Albert Canillas

The final 14-men squad was revealed on 25 August 2023.

No.	Pos.	Player	Date of birth (age)	Club
2	FW	Pol Cano	10 March 2004 (aged 19)	(Spain) Barça Atlètic
3	DF	Pol Salas	31 January 2005 (aged 18)	(Spain) Barça Atlètic
4	FW	Miguel Vicente	1 January 2004 (aged 19)	(Spain) Aljucer-ElPozo Murcia
5	FW	Roger Panadés	26 February 2004 (aged 19)	(Spain) Les Corts UBAE AE
6	DF	Rubén Rodó	8 May 2005 (aged 18)	(Spain) Barça Atlètic
7	FW	Víctor Ramos	9 March 2004 (aged 19)	(Spain) Industrias Santa Coloma
8	DF	Francisco Martínez	18 September 2004 (aged 18)	(Spain) Aljucer-ElPozo Murcia
9	DF	Adrián Tapias	2 December 2003 (aged 19)	(Spain) Barça Atlètic
10	FW	Juan Moreno	25 April 2004 (aged 19)	(Spain) Levante UD
11	FW	Gonzalo Cruz	8 July 2004 (aged 19)	(Spain) Real Betis Futsal
12	GK	Pau López	9 April 2004 (aged 19)	(Spain) Barça Atlètic
13	GK	José Nicolás	7 March 2007 (aged 16)	(Spain) Aljucer-ElPozo Murcia
14	FW	Miquel Soler	10 February 2006 (aged 17)	(Spain) Mallorca Palma Futsal
15	FW	Alejandro García	26 January 2005 (aged 18)	(Spain) Aljucer-ElPozo Murcia

== Group B ==
=== Finland ===
Head coach: Kerkko Huhtanen

The final 17-men squad was revealed on 15 August 2023. Vertti Niskanen, Kosti Lehto and Pekko Peltola are a reserve players.

No.	Pos.	Player	Date of birth (age)	Club
1	GK	Otso Honkonen	30 March 2004 (aged 19)	(Finland) KaDy
2	DF	Samuel Vuohtoniemi	26 October 2005 (aged 17)	(Finland) KäPa
3	FW	Aake Alisaari	27 May 2004 (aged 19)	(Finland) AU
4	DF	Atte Taipale	21 September 2004 (aged 18)	(Finland) Vieska Futsal
5	FW	Oskari Malmivaara	14 March 2004 (aged 19)	(Finland) GFT
6	FW	Aaro Paappanen	11 October 2004 (aged 18)	(Finland) KaDy
7	DF	Mikko Mämmilä	24 January 2004 (aged 19)	(Finland) ToPV
8	FW	Otto Mäntylä	6 February 2004 (aged 19)	(Finland) ToPV
9	DF	Otto Niemelä	10 June 2005 (aged 18)	(Finland) ToPV
10	FW	Eric Sylla	8 September 2004 (aged 18)	(Finland) KaDy
11	FW	Niko Pulkkinen	4 December 2004 (aged 18)	(Finland) KaDy
12	GK	Veeti Häätylä	24 August 2004 (aged 19)	(Finland) Mad Max
13	DF	Otto Marjamäki	12 August 2005 (aged 18)	(Finland) Ilves FS
14	DF	Tuukka Kruuti	13 March 2004 (aged 19)	(Finland) Ilves FS

=== Italy ===
Head coach: Massimiliano Bellarte

The final 14-men squad was revealed on 30 August 2023.

No.	Pos.	Player	Date of birth (age)	Club
1	GK	Samuele Yaghoubian	16 September 2004 (aged 18)	(Italy) Fenice Veneziamestre
3	DF	Alessandro Schettino	14 February 2005 (aged 18)	(Italy) L84
4	FW	Simone Turrisi	29 March 2005 (aged 18)	(Italy) EUR
7	FW	Giuseppe Lavrendi	12 July 2004 (aged 19)	(Italy) Roma
8	DF	Matteo Avellano	21 December 2004 (aged 18)	(Italy) CDM Futsal
9	FW	Gabriele Ficara	6 December 2005 (aged 17)	(Italy) Roma
10	DF	Barnaba Bui	30 July 2004 (aged 19)	(Italy) Fenice Veneziamestre
11	FW	Francesco Vescio	11 June 2004 (aged 19)	(Italy) Aosta 511
12	GK	Alessio Gattarelli	2 October 2004 (aged 18)	(Italy) Todis Lido di Ostia
14	FW	Gianluca Salvetti	30 March 2006 (aged 17)	(Italy) Futsal Giorgione
16	FW	Tommaso Ceccarelli	8 September 2007 (aged 15)	(Italy) Olimpus Roma
17	DF	Giulio Perazzetta	14 August 2005 (aged 18)	(Italy) Came Treviso
18	DF	Tommaso La Barbera	30 August 2005 (aged 18)	(Italy) Villaurea
20	FW	Tommaso Grosso	20 July 2004 (aged 19)	(Italy) Aosta 511

=== Slovenia ===
Head coach: Tomislav Horvat

The final 14-men squad was revealed on 21 August 2023.

No.	Pos.	Player	Date of birth (age)	Club
1	GK	Nik Ambrožič	1 April 2004 (aged 19)	(Slovenia) The Nutrition Extrem
2	DF	Niko Kosec	27 December 2004 (aged 18)	(Slovenia) KMN Meteorplast Šic Bar
3	FW	Kristjan Čeh	15 October 2005 (aged 17)	(Slovenia) KMN Miklavž
4	FW	Luka Čop	19 November 2004 (aged 18)	(Slovenia) The Nutrition Extrem
5	FW	Lovro Skrinjar	14 February 2004 (aged 19)	(Slovenia) ŠD Mlinše
6	DF	Luka Grm	2 March 2005 (aged 18)	(Slovenia) FK Dobrepolje
7	DF	Vid Kos	23 February 2004 (aged 19)	(Slovenia) KMN Meteorplast Šic Bar
8	DF	Žiga Frank	18 September 2004 (aged 18)	(Slovenia) FK Siliko
9	DF	Lovro Trdin	8 July 2006 (aged 17)	(Slovenia) KMN Meteorplast Šic Bar
10	DF	Alen Ruis	19 May 2004 (aged 19)	(Slovenia) KMN Meteorplast Šic Bar
11	FW	Gaj Križaj	20 January 2004 (aged 19)	(Slovenia) ŠD Mlinše
12	GK	Luka Lovrec	8 March 2005 (aged 18)	(Slovenia) KMN Meteorplast
13	DF	Andraž Gregorič	16 September 2004 (aged 18)	(Slovenia) The Nutrition Extrem
14	FW	Anže Žlindra	21 May 2004 (aged 19)	(Slovenia) The Nutrition Extrem

=== Ukraine ===
Head coach: Ihor Moskvychov

The final 14-men squad was revealed on 21 August 2023.

No.	Pos.	Player	Date of birth (age)	Club
1	GK	Ivan Bielimov	28 March 2006 (aged 17)	(Ukraine) Chorne More
2	DF	Dmytro Rybitskyi	20 March 2004 (aged 19)	(Poland) Futsal Szczecin
4	DF	Ilya Prykhodko	14 November 2007 (aged 15)	(Ukraine) Uragan
5	FW	Roman Tatumirak	21 April 2005 (aged 18)	(Italy) United Pomezia
6	DF	Vladyslav Tkachenko	29 November 2004 (aged 18)	(Poland) Red Devils
7	FW	Andriy Yelishev	10 September 2004 (aged 18)	(Poland) Red Devils
8	FW	Dmytro Fedyk	1 November 2005 (aged 17)	(Ukraine) Uragan
9	FW	Maksym Malynovskyi	27 March 2004 (aged 19)	(Ukraine) Kardinal Rivne
11	FW	Denys Snitsarenko	21 January 2005 (aged 18)	(Ukraine) SkyUp Futsal
12	GK	Kostyantyn Rafalskyi	5 December 2005 (aged 17)	(Ukraine) Kardinal Rivne
13	FW	Vadym Tiutiurai	15 January 2004 (aged 19)	(Ukraine) Kardinal Rivne
14	DF	Dmytro Skybchyk	12 October 2004 (aged 18)	(Ukraine) Kardinal Rivne
16	GK	Dmytro Diachenko	26 January 2004 (aged 19)	(Ukraine) Kardinal Rivne
17	FW	Ihor Peletskyi	12 October 2004 (aged 18)	(Lithuania) Vikingai
