= 2019–20 Maltese Futsal League =

Maltese Futsal League
- Season: 2019–20
- Country: Malta
- Champions: Luxol St Andrews (4th title)
- Relegated: none
- 2020–21 UEFA Futsal Champions League: Luxol

The 2019–20 Maltese Futsal Premier League is the 9th season of the Maltese Futsal League, the top Maltese league for futsal clubs, since its establishment in 2011. It is also 21st season of the futsal championship in Malta, since the beginning of organized futsal in the country in 1999.

== Format ==
The 2011–12 Maltese Futsal First Division was contested in two stages. In the first phase, the league consisted of ten teams

== Elite League ==
With only two rounds remaining before the end of the regular phase of the Elite League, Luxol led the standings with 30 points, followed by Valletta on 16. University of Malta had eight points, four ahead of Swieqi United Futsal.

Elite League standings (with two rounds remaining)
Pos	Club	Pts
1	Luxol	30
2	Valletta	16
3	University of Malta	8
4	Swieqi United Futsal	4

=== Top goalscorers ===
Top scorers
Player	Club	Goals
Mark Zammit (c)	Luxol	10
Celino Alves	Luxol	9
Sergio González Morales	Swieqi	9
Andy Mangion	Luxol	8
Dylan Musu	UOM	8
Zvezdan Vuković	Valletta	8

== Amateur League ==
The Amateur League table was led by Luxol Futsal Team B with 23 points, immediately before the interruption caused by the COVID-19 outbreak.

Pos	Team	Pts
1	Luxol B	23
2	Swieqi Futsal B	18
3	Żurrieq Futsal	15
4	Marsaskala	12
5	Qormi	4
6	South Boys Futsal	4

== COVID-19 outbreak and champions announced ==
Luxol and Luxol Futsal Team B were declared champions of the Elite League and the Amateur League respectively in the 2019–20 season. The leagues were suspended in March due to the COVID-19 pandemic and eventually terminated in April by the MFA Executive Committee. In May, the MFA Council voted in favour of a proposal declaring the teams that were at the top of their respective tables as champions. Luxol will represent Malta in the 2020-21 UEFA Futsal Champions League.
