= MFC Prodexim Kherson =

Prodexim Kherson
- Full name: MFC Prodexim Kherson
- Founded: 2006
- Dissolved: 2022
- Ground: SportComplex of KhVUFK, Kherson, Ukraine
- Capacity: 350
- Chairman: (Ukraine) Ihor Kolykhaiev
- Manager: (Brazil) Andre Brocanelo
- League: Extra-Liga
Home colours	Away colours

MFC Prodexim Kherson (ukr. Міні-Футбольний Клуб «Продексім» Херсон), is a futsal club from Kherson, Ukraine, and plays in Ukrainian Men's Futsal Championship.

Club dissolved in 2022 due to Russia's armed aggression against Ukraine.

== Honours ==
=== Domestic ===
- Ukrainian Extra-Liga:

(gold) Winners (4): 2016/17, 2017/18, 2018/19, 2019/20
(silver) Runners-up (1): 2020/21
(bronze) Third place (1): 2015/16

- Ukrainian Futsal Cup:

(gold) Winners (1): 2020/21
(silver) Runners-up (1): 2018/19

=== European ===
- UEFA Futsal Champions League

Round of 16: 2020/21

== Season by season ==
Season	Ukrainian Championship	Ukrainian Cup	European competitions
2009-10	Champion Ukrainian Amateurs' Championship	Winner Ukrainian Amateurs' Cup	‒
2010-11	Runner-up Ukrainian First League	Winner Ukrainian Amateurs' Cup	‒
2014-15	7th place Ukrainian First League	‒	‒
2015-16	3rd place Extra-Liga	1/8 Finals Ukrainian Cup	‒
2016-17	Champion Extra-Liga	1/8 Finals Ukrainian Cup	‒
2017-18	Champion Extra-Liga	1/4 Finals Ukrainian Cup	UEFA Futsal Cup Elite round
2018-19	Champion Extra-Liga	Runner-up Ukrainian Cup	Champions League Main round
2019-20	Champion Extra-Liga	1/2 Finals Ukrainian Cup	Champions League Elite round
2020-21	Runner-up Extra-Liga	Winner Ukrainian Cup	Champions League Round of 16
2021-22	Dissolved		

== MFC Prodexim Kherson in European football ==
As of match played February 2021

Season	Round	Opponent	Score	Result
2017–18	Main round Kragujevac, Serbia	(Portugal) Sporting CP	1–5	L
2017–18	Main round Kragujevac, Serbia	(Serbia) Ekonomac	2–4	L
2017–18	Main round Kragujevac, Serbia	(Latvia) Nikars Riga	4–2	W
2017–18	Elite round Győr, Hungary	(Italy) Luparense	1–3	L
2017–18	Elite round Győr, Hungary	(Hungary) Győri ETO	2–3	L
2017–18	Elite round Győr, Hungary	(Belarus) Stalitsa Minsk	7–3	W
2018–19	Main round Kragujevac, Serbia	(Spain) Inter FS	0–3	L
2018–19	Main round Kragujevac, Serbia	(Serbia) Ekonomac	2–3	L
2018–19	Main round Kragujevac, Serbia	(Czech Republic) Era-Pack Chrudim	0–1	L
2019–20	Main round Halle, Belgium	(Portugal) Benfica	1–1	D
2019–20	Main round Halle, Belgium	(Belgium) FP Halle-Gooik	7–3	W
2019–20	Main round Halle, Belgium	(Azerbaijan) Araz Naxçıvan	8–3	W
2019–20	Elite round Minsk, Belarus	(Belarus) Stalitsa Minsk	2–1	W
2019–20	Elite round Minsk, Belarus	(Spain) Barcelona	2–4	L
2019–20	Elite round Minsk, Belarus	(Czech Republic) Sparta Praha	5–2	W
2020–21	Preliminary round Odesa, Ukraine	(Northern Ireland) Rosario	28–1	W
2020–21	Round of 32; Zaporizhzhia, Ukraine	(North Macedonia) Shkupi	5–1	W
2020–21	Round of 16; Torrejón de Ardoz, Spain	(Spain) Inter FS	2–4	L

Note: In the 2022–23 UEFA Futsal Champions League, Prodexim Kherson was selected to represent Ukraine but was withdrawn by UEFA due to the Russian occupation of Kherson. They were replaced by Uragan Ivano-Frankivsk.

=== Summary ===
Season	Pld	W	D	L	GF	GA	Last round
2017–18	6	2	0	4	17	20	Elite round
2018–19	3	0	0	3	2	7	Main round
2019–20	6	4	1	1	25	14	Elite round
2020–21	3	2	0	1	35	6	Round of 16
Total	18	8	1	9	79	47	
