= Stanislav Honcharenko =

Soviet footballer and coach

Personal information
- Full name: Stanislav Oleksandrovych Honcharenko
- Date of birth: 1 November 1960 (age 65)
- Place of birth: Kiev, Ukrainian SSR, Soviet Union
- Height: 1.80 m (5 ft 11 in)
- Position: Forward

Youth career
- Spartak Kyiv
- Temp Kyiv

Senior career*
Years	Team	Apps	(Gls)
1979–1981	FC Stroitel Pripyat		
1982	FC Zirka Kirovohrad		
1997–1998	FC Interkas-2 Kyiv	3	(0)

Managerial career
- 1982–1985: Start Kyiv (academy)
- 1985–1986: Zmina-Obolon Kyiv (academy)
- 1986–1989: SKA Kiev (academy)
- 1990: FC Dynamo Bila Tserkva (ass't)
- 1991–1992: FC Ros Bila Tserkva
- 1993: FC Khimik Severodonetsk
- 1994–1995: FC Obolon Kyiv
- 1996–2007: MFC Interkas Kyiv
- 2008–2011: Time Lviv
- 2011–2012: SC Enerhiya Lviv
- 2013–: SC Politekhnik Kyiv
- * Club domestic league appearances and goals

Stanislav Honcharenko (Ukrainian: Станіслав Олександрович Гончаренко; 1 November 1960) is a former Soviet football forward and coach. Although started as an association football player, most notable he has become a coach of Ukrainian futsal and later was honored as a Merited Coach of Ukraine.

== Career ==
A native of Kyiv, Honcharenko in his interview mentioned that he had a complicated childhood growing up in an orphanage (children home) and later a boarding school for orphans. After graduating from school, Hocharenko worked as a turner at the Petrovsky Automation Factory (Zavod imeni Petrovskoho) at the same time playing for a team from Hrebinka that was coached by a former football star of Dynamo Yuriy Voinov. A year after that Honcharenko joined Budivelnyk Prypiat which was also managed by former Dynamo player Anatoliy Shepel. Since starting playing for Budivelnyk, Honcharenko also started to earn enough money exclusively as a footballer and left his work at the factory. Later Honcharenko joined Zirka Kirovohrad, but received a very serious injury and after a surgery was forced to retire from playing.

After retiring from playing career, Honcharenko decided to become a children coach and in interview confirmed that he considers Ivan Terletsky his "spiritual father" who guided him with consultations and predicted him outstanding achievements. He noted that when in 1989 he won with his junior team Ukrainian championship, Terletsky recommended him to president of the Football Federation of Ukraine Mykola Fominykh and later both Fominykh and Terletsky offered him as an assistant coach to Volodymyr Onyshchenko who was appointed a manager for FC Dynamo Bila Tserkva. In Bila Tserkva Honcharenko started his life in "the Big Football". After the first season Onyshchenko was called to coach in FC Dynamo Kyiv and Honcharenko at first as interim after a month and half became a fully fledged manager (head coach). Already after dissolution of the Soviet Union in 1992 with Ros Bila Tserkva he placed fourth in the Ukrainian First League (there were two groups). At winter break of the 1992–93 Ukrainian First League, Honcharenko became manager of FC Khimik Severodonetsk, but left it at winter break of the next season due to family issues. Honcharenko explained that while for him conditions at the club were excellent, his wife was pregnant and did not want to give birth in Severodonetsk due to smoke caused by the local chemical plant "Azot". A t-shirt, that one would dress in the morning, after lunch had to be put through laundry.

After that Honcharenko had offers from FC Nyva Vinnytsia and FC Metalist Kharkiv, but turned them down and became a manager of FC Obolon Kyiv that then played among KFK (collectives of physical culture, – amateurs). Honcharenko managed to gain promotion with Obolon to the Second League, but during its debuting season left the club due to misunderstanding with the club's leadership. Honcharenko explained that the club in 1990s was not part of the Obolon brewing company, but rather represented the Obolon urban raion of Kyiv city and financed by Serhiy Sydorenko and Oleksandr Narovlianskyi. Honcharenko believes that they came under influence of a local crime boss known as "Fascist" who may have influenced their decision not to fulfill an agreement and let Honcharenko go.

In 1996 on proposition of his team partner of Dynamo football veterans Serhiy Veselov, he switched to futsal becoming one of the most successful futsal coaches in Ukraine with Interkas Kyiv.
