= Extra-Liga =

- Founded: 1993
- Country: Ukraine
- Confederation: UEFA (through UAF)
- Number of clubs: 10
- Level on pyramid: 1
- International cup: UEFA Futsal Cup
- Current champions: MFC HIT Kyiv (2025–26)
- Most championships: MFC Shakhtar Donetsk (5 titles)
- Website: http://futsal.com.ua/extra-league
- Current: Current season at UEFA.com

The Extra-Liga (Ukrainian: Екстра-ліга) is an association of futsal clubs of Ukraine and the top men's futsal league in the country. It is organized by the Association of Mini-Football of Ukraine which is a collective member of the Ukrainian Association of Football (formerly Football Federation of Ukraine). The Ukrainian Association of Mini-Football is not part of the Olympic movement, but is a collective members of the Ukrainian Association of Football.

== History ==
In early 1990s futsal competitions along with other alternative types of association football such as beach football, football among women, others started to gain wider popularity worldwide and since 1996 there appeared continental competitions among European futsal clubs under auspices of UEFA.

The original Ukrainian championship among futsal clubs was founded in 1993 as a descendant of the general futsal movement among students in the Soviet Union. Prior to this, the Ukrainian teams played in the Soviet competitions that has been developing in late 1980s. The first Soviet competitions in 1990 and 1991 were conducted primarily in Ukraine. Among notable Ukrainian clubs of the Soviet period were Mekhanizator from Dnipropetrovsk, Syntez from Kremenchuk and others.

Following dissolution of the Soviet Union, the official Ukrainian competitions were reorganized after some pause in late 1993 as the Top League.

In 2011 a new Ukrainian futsal super league was formed, Extra-Liga, beginning in the 2011–12 season. Previously, the 8 highest finishing teams in the league advanced into the playoffs. The winner of the Championship playoffs gained qualification for the UEFA Futsal Cup.

Some regular association football clubs of Ukraine are fielding also their futsal squads, including both male and female. Other futsal clubs exist independently, while some such as MFC Interkas Kyiv originally competed in amateur competitions of association football before switching to futsal (indoor). Among notable footballers who competed in competitions of association football and later switched to futsal competitions is Stanislav Honcharenko.

== Winners ==
Year	Gold	Silver	Bronze
1993–94	Slid Kyiv	Nadiya Zaporizhia	Nika Dnipropetrovsk
1994–95	Mekhanizator Dnipropetrovsk	Hirnyk Krasnohorivka	Nadiya Zaporizhia
1995–96	Lokomotyv Odesa	Mekhanizator Dnipropetrovsk	DSS Zaporizhia
1996–97	Lokomotyv Odesa	Interkas Kyiv	DSS Zaporizhia
1997–98	Lokomotyv Odesa	Interkas Kyiv	Winner Ford-Universytet Zaporizhia
1998–99	Interkas Kyiv	Winner Ford-Universytet Zaporizhia	Zaporizhkoks Zaporizhia
1999–00	Interkas Kyiv	Zaporizhkoks Zaporizhia	DSS Zaporizhia
2000–01	Unisport-Budstar Kyiv	Interkas Kyiv	DSS Zaporizhia
2001–02	Shakhtar Donetsk	Interkraz Kyiv	DSS Zaporizhia
2002–03	Interkraz Kyiv	Shakhtar Donetsk	DSS Zaporizhia
2003–04	Shakhtar Donetsk	DSS Zaporizhia	Yenakiievets Yenakiieve
2004–05	Shakhtar Donetsk	Interkas Kyiv	Yenakiievets Yenakiieve
2005–06	Shakhtar Donetsk	Energia Lviv	Interkas Kyiv
2006–07	Energia Lviv	Interkas Kyiv	Shakhtar Donetsk
2007–08	Shakhtar Donetsk	Energia Lviv	Yenakiievets Yenakiieve
2008–09	Time Lviv	Shakhtar Donetsk	Yenakiievets Yenakiieve
2009–10	Time Lviv	Shakhtar Donetsk	Energia Lviv
2010–11	Uragan Ivano-Frankivsk	Energia-Time Lviv	Lokomotyv Kharkiv
2011–12	Energia Lviv	Lokomotyv Kharkiv	Uragan Ivano-Frankivsk
2012–13	Lokomotyv Kharkiv	Uragan Ivano-Frankivsk	Energia Lviv
2013–14	Lokomotyv Kharkiv	Energia Lviv	Uragan Ivano-Frankivsk
2014–15	Lokomotyv Kharkiv	Sportlider Khmelnytskyi	Energia Lviv
2015–16	Energia Lviv	Lokomotyv Kharkiv	Prodexim Kherson
2016–17	Prodexim Kherson	Energia Lviv	Lokomotyv Kharkiv
2017–18	Prodexim Kherson	Energia Lviv	Tytan Pokrovske
2018–19	Prodexim Kherson	Uragan Ivano-Frankivsk	HIT Kyiv
2019–20	Prodexim Kherson	HIT Kyiv	Uragan Ivano-Frankivsk
2020–21	Uragan Ivano-Frankivsk	Prodexim Kherson	HIT Kyiv
2021–22	Prodexim Kherson	Uragan Ivano-Frankivsk	HIT Kyiv
2022–23	HIT Kyiv	Uragan Ivano-Frankivsk	Kardynal-Rivne
2023–24	HIT Kyiv	Energia Lviv	Uragan Ivano-Frankivsk
2024–25	HIT Kyiv	Kyiv Futsal	SkyUp Futsal Kyiv
2025–26	HIT Kyiv	Athletic Dnipro	Sukha Balka

== Performance by club ==
Team	Winners	Runner-up	Third place
Shakhtar Donetsk	5	3	1
HIT Kyiv	4	1	2
Prodexim Kherson	4	1	1
Energia Lviv (Energia-Time)	3	7	3
Interkas Kyiv (Interkraz)	3	6	1
Lokomotyv Kharkiv	3	2	2
Lokomotyv Odesa	3	0	0
Uragan Ivano-Frankivsk	2	3	4
Time Lviv	2	0	0
Mekhanizator Dnipropetrovsk	1	1	0
Slid Kyiv (Kyiv-Unisport)	1	0	0
Unisport-Budstar Kyiv	1	0	0
Zaporizhkoks Zaporizhia (Nadiya)	0	2	2
DSS Zaporizhia	0	1	6
Winner Ford-Universytet Zaporizhia	0	1	1
Hirnyk Krasnohorivka	0	1	0
Sportlider Khmelnytskyi	0	1	0
Kyiv Futsal	0	1	0
Athletic Dnipro	0	1	0
Yenakiievets Yenakiieve	0	0	4
Nika Dnipropetrovsk	0	0	1
Tytan Pokrovske	0	0	1
Kardynal-Rivne	0	0	1
SkyUp Futsal Kyiv	0	0	1
Sukha Balka	0	0	1
Total	32	32	32

== See also ==
- Ukrainian Women's Futsal Championship
