= Ukrainian Women's Futsal Championship =

- Founded: 1995
- Country: Ukraine
- Confederation: UEFA
- Number of clubs: 7
- Level on pyramid: 1
- International cup: UEFA Futsal Cup
- Most championships: Nika-Universytet Poltava-10

The Ukrainian Women's Futsal Championship (Ukrainian: Чемпіонат України з футзалу. Вища ліга) is the top women's league of Ukrainian futsal. It was founded in 1995. It is organized by the Football Federation of Ukraine (FFU). Before, the Ukrainian teams played in the championship of the USSR. Between leagues at the end of each season, the teams exchanged - the worst drop in the lower-ranking division, their places are taken by the best team of the lower leagues. The best teams of the Premier League to play in UEFA Futsal Cup held under the auspices of the UEFA.

== Ukrainian women's futsall Champions ==
| Year | Gold | Silver | Bronze |
|---|---|---|---|
| 1995 | Nika Chernivtsi/Poltava | Unisport Kyiv | Minora Cherkasy |
| 1996 | Bilychanka Kotsiubynske | Unisport Kyiv | Minora Cherkasy |
| 1997 | Nika Poltava | Minora Cherkasy | Kharkivyanka Kharkiv |
| 1998 | Nika-Universytet Poltava | Unisport-Obolon Kyiv | Lvivyanka Lviv |
| 1999 | Nika-Universytet Poltava | Fortuna-Cheksil Chernihiv | Obolon Kyiv |
| 2000 | Nika-Universytet Poltava | Fortuna-Cheksil Chernihiv | Bilychanka Kotsiubynske |
| 2001 | Nika-Universytet Poltava | Fortuna-Cheksil Chernihiv | Bilychanka Kotsiubynske |
| 2002 | Nika-Universytet Poltava | Fortuna-Cheksil Chernihiv | Bilychanka Kotsiubynske |
| 2003 | Nika-Universytet Poltava | Fortuna-Cheksil Chernihiv | Bilychanka Kotsiubynske |
| 2004 | Bilychanka Kotsiubynske | Spartak-Fortuna Chernihiv | Nika-Universytet Poltava |
| 2005 | Nika-Universytet Poltava | Bilychanka Kotsiubynske | Interplast Luhansk |
| 2006 | Interplast Luhansk | Nika-Universytet Poltava | SotsTekh Kyiv |
| 2007 | Nika-Universytet Poltava | Bilychanka Kotsiubynske | SotsTekh Kyiv |
| 2008 | Bilychanka-NPU Kotsiubynske | NUKhT Kyiv | KyivHaz Kyiv |
| 2009 | Bilychanka-NPU Kotsiubynske | Nika-Universytet Poltava | NUKhT Kyiv |
| 2010 | Bilychanka-NPU Kotsiubynske | Olimpik Dnipropetrovsk | Sparta K Kyiv |
| 2011 | Bilychanka-NPU Kotsiubynske | Nika-Universytet Poltava | Sparta K Kyiv |

== Performance by club ==
| Team | Championships |
|---|---|
| Nika-Universytet Poltava | 10 |
| Belichanka-NPU Kotsiubynske | 6 |
| Interplast Luhansk | 1 |

== See also ==
- Ukrainian Men's Futsal Championship
