= PZMS Poltava =

Ukrainian futsal club

- Full name: MFC PZMS Poltava
- Founded: 1995
- Ground: PZMS Complex of Sports, Poltava, Ukraine
- Manager: Mykola Kudatskyi
- League: Women's Futsal Championship
- 2017-18: 2nd
Home colours	Away colours

MFC PZMS Poltava (ukr. Міні-Футбольний Клуб «ПЗМС» Полтава), is a futsal club from Poltava, Ukraine, and plays in Ukrainian Women's Futsal Championship.

The club is one of the most titled clubs in Ukraine.

Founded in the 1995 as "Nika Poltava" (later "Nika-Universytet Poltava", "Nika-Peduniversytet Poltava", "Nika-PNPU Poltava"). The current name is in honor of the sponsor (PMGF - Poltava Medical Glass Factory, ukr. ПЗМС - Полтавський завод медичного скла).

== Honours ==
- Ukrainian Women's Futsal Championship:

1995, 1997, 1997-98, 1998-99, 1999—2000, 2000-01, 2001-02, 2002-03, 2004-05, 2006-07

- Ukrainian Women's Futsal Cup:

1996, 2000, 2001, 2003, 2005
