= FC Feniks Drenas =

Futsal Club Feniks
- Full name: Futsal Club Feniks
- Nickname(s): Feniksat
- Founded: 2003
- Ground: Drenas, Kosovo
- League: Futsal Superleague of Kosovo
Home colours	Away colours	Third colours

Futsal Club Feniks or short FC Feniks (English: Futsal Club Feniks) are the most successful Kosovan futsal club. They have won 6 championships in the Futsal Superleague of Kosovo

FC Feniks have also participated in UEFA Futsal Cup for the very first time since Kosovo, was admitted by UEFA as a new member in March 2016.

== FC Feniks Drenas in the UEFA Futsal Champions League ==
FC Feniks wrote also history in the UEFA Futsal Cup by reaching the Elite Rounds (round of 16) as the first Futsal Club in Kosovo to do so in 2016-17

== Feniks Drenas in Europe ==
FC Feniks Drenas wrote history by reaching the Elite Round and competed with the 16 best European Futsal Clubs in this Tournament.

The results from the first Round of the UEFA Futsal Champions League until the Elite Round off the UEFA Futsal Champions League off the season 2016-17

=== First round ===
17 August 2016
18:00

Oxford City Lions (England)	2–3	(Kosovo) FC Feniks
Antoñito 11'; David Parente 27'	Report	A. Brahimi 12'; Alibegu 15'; Marcelo 36'

Centre Esportiu Serradells, Andorra la Vella
Referee: Lars Van Leeuwen (Netherlands), Daniele Di Resta (Italy)
18 August 2016
20:30

FC Encamp (Andorra)	0–12	(Kosovo) FC Feniks
	Report	Ramadani 7', 39'; Alibegu 8', 18', 27'; Belej 11', 31'; Rodek 14', 28'; Shp. Brahimi 20', 25'; Lopez Garrido 25' (o.g.)

Centre Esportiu Serradells, Andorra la Vella
Referee: Daniele Di Resta (Italy), Lars Van Leeuwen (Netherlands)
20 August 2016
18:00

FC Feniks (Kosovo)	6–0	(Israel) ASA Tel Aviv
Marcelo 17'; Rodek 22', 29'; Belej 23'; Ramadani 37'; Topilla 40'	Report

Centre Esportiu Serradells, Andorra la Vella
Referee: Lars Van Leeuwen (Netherlands), Daniele Di Resta (Italy)

=== Main round ===
11 October 2016
20:00

Železarec Skopje (North Macedonia)	0–5	(Kosovo) FC Feniks
	Report	Marcelo 12', 18'; Alibegu 14'; Mejzini 22', 30'

Boris Trajkovski Sports Center, Skopje
Referee: Moshe Bohbot (Israel), Vasilios Christodoulis (Greece)

12 October 2016
17:30

FC Feniks (Kosovo)	0–1	(Azerbaijan) Araz Naxçivan
	Report	Baghirov 11'

Boris Trajkovski Sports Center, Skopje
Referee: Simon Todorovič (Slovenia), Moshe Bohbot (Israel)

14 October 2016
13:00

Tbilisi State University (Georgia (country))	3–7	(Kosovo) FC Feniks
Lukava 14'; Sozashvili 35'; Sebiskveradze 38'	Report	Mejzini 8', 24'; Victor Vieira 10'; A. Brahimi 17', 29', 35'; Alibegu 38'

Boris Trajkovski Sports Center, Skopje
Referee: Simon Todorovič (Slovenia), Moshe Bohbot (Israel)

== Players and coaches ==
Head coach : (Kosovo) Arben Simitqiu

Note: Flags indicate national team as defined under FIFA eligibility rules; some limited exceptions apply. Players may hold more than one non-FIFA nationality.

No.	Pos.	Nation	Player
1	GK	(Kosovo) KOS	Lulzim Jusufi
2	GK	(Brazil) BRA	Cris
3	DF	(Albania) ALB	Narcis Alibegu
4	MF	(Kosovo) KOS	Dardan Topilla
5	FW	(Brazil) BRA	Victor Vieira
6	FW	(Albania) ALB	Ani Mullaj
7	FW	(Kosovo) KOS	Ramadan Alaj
8	MF	(Albania) ALB	Azem Brahimi
9	FW	(Kosovo) KOS	Agon Ramadani

No.	Pos.	Nation	Player
10	FW	(Albania) ALB	Mentor Mejzini
11	FW	(Spain) ESP	Marcelo
16	DF	(Kosovo) KOS	Shpend Brahimi
17	DF	(Albania) ALB	Kemajl Gashi
18	MF	(Czech Republic) CZE	Marcel Rodek
19	MF	(Kosovo) KOS	Shqipron Brahimi
20	DF	(Czech Republic) CZE	Michal Belej
—	GK	(Albania) ALB	Fidan Gashi
—	DF	(Colombia) COL	Angellot Caro

Squad season 2016/17 at UEFA official site, (in English).

== Domestic achievements ==
- Futsal Superleague of Kosovo
  - Champions (7):

(2003–04, 2005–06, 2007–08, 2008–09, 2009–10, 2015–16, 2017-2018 )

- Kosovo Futsal Cup
  - Winners (6): (2010-11, 2011-12,2013-14,2014-15,2015-16,2017-18)
- Kosovo futsal supercup
  - Winners(3): (2008-09,2010-11,2013-14)
