= FC Liburni Gjakovë =

Futsal Club Liburni
- Full name: Futsal Club Liburni Gjakovë
- Founded: 2009
- Ground: Gjakovë, Kosovo
- League: Futsal Superleague of Kosovo

Futsal Club Liburni or short FC Liburni (Albanian: Klubi i Futsallit Liburni) is a Kosovan futsal club. They have won the 2016–17 Futsal Superleague of Kosovo.

== Domestic achievements ==
- Futsal Superleague of Kosovo
  - Champions (1): (2016–17)

Head coach : (Kosovo) Bekim Bytyqi

Note: Flags indicate national team as defined under FIFA eligibility rules; some limited exceptions apply. Players may hold more than one non-FIFA nationality.

No.	Pos.	Nation	Player
1	GK	(Kosovo) KOS	Nuhi Krasniqi
3	DF	(Kosovo) KOS	Valon Kasapi
5	FW	(Kosovo) KOS	Ideal Brovina
6	FW	(Kosovo) KOS	Zef Prenrecaj
7	DF	(Kosovo) KOS	Nexhip Selimi
8	DF	(Kosovo) KOS	Rexhep Daci
9	DF	(Kosovo) KOS	Albert Nikolla

No.	Pos.	Nation	Player
10	FW	(Kosovo) KOS	Arbër Dobroshi
11	FW	(Albania) ALB	Halim Selmanaj
12	GK	(Kosovo) KOS	Alfred Prenqi
14	DF	(Kosovo) KOS	Malush Qerimi
15	DF	(Montenegro) MNE	Adi Alović
17	DF	(Albania) ALB	Ramadan Alaj
20	FW	(Kosovo) KOS	Azem Brahimi

at UEFA official site, (in English).
