= MFC Lokomotyv Odesa =

Lokomotyv Odesa
- Full name: MFC Lokomotyv Odesa
- Founded: 1993
- Dissolved: 1999
- Ground: Palace of Sports, Odesa, Ukraine
- Capacity: 5,000
- Chairman: Mykola Berezskyi
- Manager: Valeriy Vodyan
- League: Futsal Championship
| Home colours | Away colours |

MFC Lokomotyv Odesa (ukr. Міні-Футбольний Клуб "Локомотив" Одеса), is a futsal club from Odesa, Ukraine, and plays in Ukrainian Men's Futsal Championship.

The club was created in June 1993 by former footballer of FC Chornomorets Odesa Anatoliy Koldakov as Odesa-Nord sponsored by local "Nord Bank" (Valeriy Perminov). In September 1993 Koldakov died due to heart attack.

On April 18, 1998 MFC Lokomotiv Odesa "slammed the door" in his last official match in history by defeating Vuhlyk Makiyivka – 28:4. This victory is still the biggest in the history of Ukrainian futsal.

== Honours ==
- Extra-Liga:

1995/96, 1996/97, 1997/98

- Ukrainian Futsal Cup:

1996/97, 1997/98

- Futsal European Clubs Championship

4-th place: 1997

== See also ==
- FC Lokomotyv Odesa, an association football club
