= FC Prishtina (futsal) =

Prishtina
- Full name: FC Prishtina
- Nickname: Plisat (The Clods)
- Founded: 2015; 11 years ago
- Ground: Palace of Youth and Sports
- Capacity: 3,000 (smaller arena)
- President: Fatos Dili
- Manager: Durim Dili
- League: Futsal Superleague of Kosovo
- 2020–21: Futsal Superleague of Kosovo, 3rd
- Website: http://www.prishtinafutsal.com/

FC Prishtina, officially known as Mabetex Prishtina due to sponsorship reasons, is a professional futsal club based in Pristina, Kosovo. The club play in the Futsal Superleague of Kosovo, which is the top tier of football in the country.

== Players ==
=== Current squad ===
As of 25 November 2020

Note: Flags indicate national team as defined under FIFA eligibility rules; some limited exceptions apply. Players may hold more than one non-FIFA nationality.

No.	Pos.	Nation	Player
1	GK	KOS	Arbnor Krasniqi
2	DF	MKD	Orhan Ibishi
3	FW	KOS	Fatlum Pishtani
4	DF	KOS	Blend Berisha
5	FW	KOS	Rinor Dragusha
6	FW	KOS	Velson Morina
7	FW	KOS	Mërgim Dervishaj
8	DF	KOS	Melos Kelmendi

No.	Pos.	Nation	Player
10	FW	KOS	Jeton Rukovci
11	FW	KOS	Elton Maxharraj
12	GK	KOS	Xhemajl Beqiri
13	FW	BRA	Alan
14	FW	KOS	Arianit Mavriqi
15	DF	KOS	Mal Rezniqi
16	FW	BRA	Leandro
20	GK	KOS	Ari Beqiri

== Prishtina in Europe ==
FC Prishtina will compete in the UEFA Futsal Champions League for the first time in the 2020–21 season, entering at the preliminary round. On 21 October 2020, the draw was held and Prishtina were drawn against the Albanian side Tirana. On 25 November 2020, Prishtina beat Tirana at Palace of Youth and Sports in Pristina, this victory secured the qualification for the round of 32, where faced with the Spanish giants Barcelona, who defeated Fc Prishtina with a result of 9–2.

Season	Competition	Round	Opponent	Home	Away	Agg.
2020–21	UEFA Futsal Champions League	PR	(Albania) Tirana	3–0		
2020–21	UEFA Futsal Champions League	R32	(Spain) Barcelona	2–9		
