= 2020–21 UEFA Futsal Champions League =

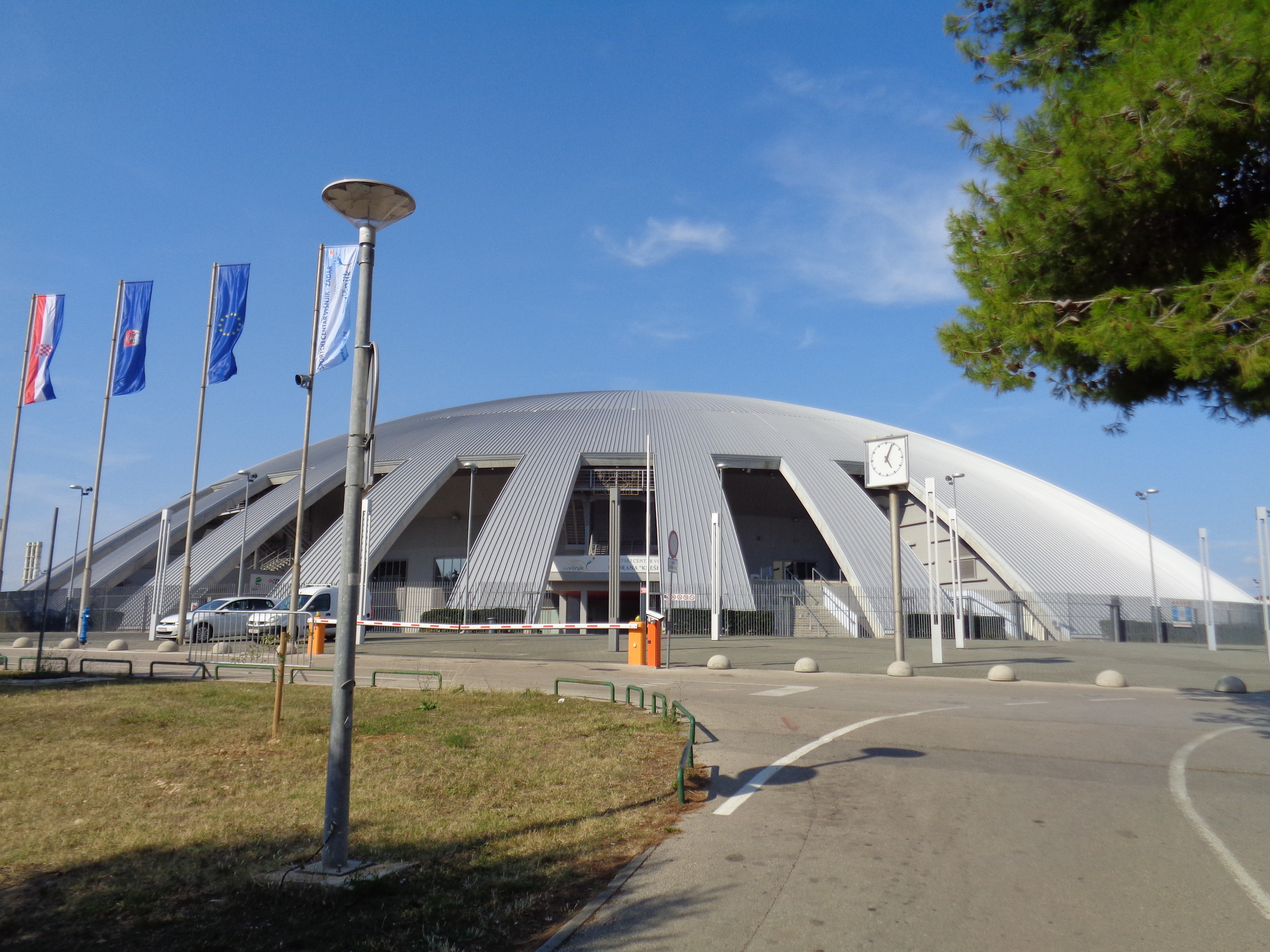
- The Krešimir Ćosić Hall hosted the final tournament

Tournament details
- Dates: Qualifying rounds: 24 November 2020 – 21 February 2021; Final tournament: 28 April – 3 May 2021
- Teams: Final tournament: 8 Total: 55 (from 51 associations)

Final positions
- Champions: (Portugal) Sporting CP (2nd title)
- Runners-up: (Spain) Barcelona

Tournament statistics
- Matches played: 52
- Goals scored: 346 (6.65 per match)
- Top scorer(s): Season total: (Ukraine) Petro Shoturma (7 goals); Final tournament: (Brazil) Ferrão (5 goals)

The 2020–21 UEFA Futsal Champions League was the 35th edition of Europe's premier club futsal tournament, and the 20th edition organized by UEFA. It was also the third edition since the tournament was rebranded from "UEFA Futsal Cup" to "UEFA Futsal Champions League".

The final tournament was held at Krešimir Ćosić Hall in Zadar, Croatia from 28 April to 3 May 2021, and was the first time that the final tournament was held at a neutral venue instead of in the country of one of the qualified teams. It was originally set to be held at the Minsk Arena in Minsk, Belarus, which was originally appointed to host the 2020 final tournament. However, on 17 June 2020, the UEFA Executive Committee chose to relocate the 2020 finals to Palau Blaugrana in Barcelona, Spain due to the COVID-19 pandemic in Europe, and Minsk instead hosted the 2021 finals. On 23 February 2021, the UEFA Executive Committee chose to relocate the 2021 finals to the Arena Zagreb in Zagreb, Croatia due to travel restrictions imposed by the COVID-19 pandemic in Europe. On 7 April 2021, the finals were once again relocated, this time to the Krešimir Ćosić Hall in Zadar, after the request of Croatian national health authorities to use the Arena Zagreb.

Due to the COVID-19 pandemic in Europe, the format of the competition was changed, with all qualifying matches played as single leg matches, and the final tournament consisting of eight instead of four teams.

Sporting CP defeated title holders Barcelona in the final to win their second title.

== Association team allocation ==
The association ranking based on the UEFA futsal national team coefficients is used to determine the number of participating teams for each association:

- The top three-ranked associations can enter two teams.
- The winners of the 2019–20 UEFA Futsal Champions League qualify automatically, and thus their association can also enter a second team. If they are from the top three-ranked associations, the fourth-ranked association can also enter two teams.
- All other associations can enter one team (the winners of their regular top domestic futsal league, or in special circumstances, the runners-up).

For this season, the top three-ranked associations, Spain, Portugal and Russia, can enter two teams. As the title holders are from Spain, the fourth-ranked association, Kazakhstan, can also enter two teams.

=== Distribution ===
Teams are ranked according to their UEFA futsal club coefficients, computed based on results of the last three seasons, to decide on the round they enter, as well as their seeding in draws.

The following is the access list for this season under the revised format.

Access list for 2020–21 UEFA Futsal Champions League
	Teams entering in this round	Teams advancing from previous round
Preliminary round (46 teams)	46 teams ranked 9–54	
Round of 32 (32 teams)	Title holders; 8 teams ranked 1–8	23 winners of preliminary round
Round of 16 (16 teams)		16 winners of round of 32
Final tournament (8 teams)		8 winners of round of 16

=== Teams ===
In early April 2020, UEFA announced that due to the COVID-19 pandemic, the deadline for entering the tournament had been postponed until further notice.

A total of 55 teams from 51 of the 55 UEFA member associations participate in the 2020–21 UEFA Futsal Champions League. The title holders and the eight teams with the highest UEFA futsal club coefficients receive byes to the round of 32, and the other 46 teams enter the preliminary round.

All teams in italics are declared champions or selected to play by the national association following an abandoned season due to the COVID-19 pandemic in Europe, and are subject to approval by UEFA as per the guidelines for entry to European competitions in response to the COVID-19 pandemic.

Legend

- TH: Title holders

Qualified teams for 2020–21 UEFA Futsal Champions League

Teams entering round of 32
Rank	Association	Team	Coeff.
TH	Spain (Spain 2)	Barcelona	69.001
1	Spain (Spain 1)	Inter FS	60.667
2	Portugal (Portugal 1)	Sporting CP	57.999
3	Kazakhstan (Kazakhstan 1)	Kairat	35.667
4	Portugal (Portugal 2)	Benfica	33.332
5	Russia (Russia 1)	KPRF	24.000
6	Russia (Russia 2)	Gazprom-Ugra Yugorsk	20.333
7	Kazakhstan (Kazakhstan 2)	Aktobe	16.000
8	Slovenia	Dobovec	14.501

Teams entering preliminary round
Rank	Association	Team	Coeff.
9	Italy	Pesaro	14.167
10	Ukraine	Prodexim Kherson	14.000
11	Poland	Rekord Bielsko-Biała	10.502
12	Czech Republic	Chrudim	10.333
13	Lithuania	Vytis	7.749
14	Armenia	Leo	7.500
15	Azerbaijan	Araz Naxçivan	6.999
16	Croatia	Olmissum	6.834
17	Hungary	MVFC Berettyóújfalu	6.500
18	Belgium	Charleroi	6.000
19	Belarus	Viten Orsha	5.501
20	Malta	Luxol St Andrews	5.167
21	Slovakia	MIMEL Lučenec	4.916
22	Serbia	Red Star Belgrade	4.667
23	Netherlands	Hovocubo	4.667
24	Germany	Hohenstein-Ernstthal	3.833
25	North Macedonia	Shkupi	3.833
26	Romania	United Galați	3.667
27	Switzerland	Minerva	3.376
28	Bosnia and Herzegovina	Salines	2.834
29	Cyprus	Omonia	2.417
30	Kosovo	Prishtina	2.334
31	England	Helvécia	2.168
32	France	ACCS	2.084
33	Denmark	Gentofte	2.084
34	Georgia	Tbilisi State University	2.000
35	Austria	Allstars	2.000
36	Sweden	Hammarby IF	1.667
37	Latvia	Petrow	1.667
38	Estonia	Viimsi Smsraha	1.583
39	Finland	Akaa	1.333
40	Montenegro	Titograd	1.167
41	Gibraltar	Lynx	1.001
42	Greece	AEK	0.750
43	Albania	Tirana	0.750
44	Turkey	Piyalepaşa	0.667
45	Norway	Utleira	0.667
46	Israel	Ashdod Dolphins	0.583
47	Luxembourg	Differdange 03	0.583
48	Republic of Ireland	Blue Magic	0.583
49	Bulgaria	Cherno More	0.500
50	Scotland	PYF Saltires	0.500
51	Wales	Swansea University	0.250
52	Andorra	Encamp	0.250
53	San Marino	Fiorentino	0.084
54	Northern Ireland	Rosario	0.000

Associations which did not enter
Faroe Islands	Iceland	Liechtenstein	Moldova

Notes

1. Albania (ALB): The league was abandoned due to the COVID-19 pandemic in Albania. The previous season's champions, Tirana, were selected to play in the 2020–21 UEFA Futsal Champions League by the Albanian Football Association.
2. Andorra (AND): The league was abandoned due to the COVID-19 pandemic in Andorra. The top team of the league at the time of the abandonment, Encamp, were selected to play in the 2020–21 UEFA Futsal Champions League by the Andorran Football Federation.
3. Azerbaijan (AZE): The league was abandoned due to the COVID-19 pandemic in Azerbaijan. The top team of the league at the time of the abandonment, Araz Naxçivan (who were declared champions), were selected to play in the 2020–21 UEFA Futsal Champions League by the Association of Football Federations of Azerbaijan.
4. Belgium (BEL): The league was abandoned due to the COVID-19 pandemic in Belgium. The top team of the league at the time of the abandonment, Charleroi (who were declared champions), were selected to play in the 2020–21 UEFA Futsal Champions League by the Royal Belgian Football Association.
5. Bosnia and Herzegovina (BIH): The league was abandoned due to the COVID-19 pandemic in Bosnia and Herzegovina. The top team of the league at the time of the abandonment, Salines (who were declared champions), were selected to play in the 2020–21 UEFA Futsal Champions League by the Football Association of Bosnia and Herzegovina.
6. Bulgaria (BUL): The league was abandoned due to the COVID-19 pandemic in Bulgaria. The top team of the league at the time of the abandonment, Cherno More (who were declared champions), were selected to play in the 2020–21 UEFA Futsal Champions League by the Bulgarian Football Union.
7. Cyprus (CYP): The league was abandoned due to the COVID-19 pandemic in Cyprus. The top team of the league at the time of the abandonment, Omonia, were selected to play in the 2020–21 UEFA Futsal Champions League by the Cyprus Football Association.
8. Czech Republic (CZE): The league was abandoned due to the COVID-19 pandemic in the Czech Republic. The top team of the league at the time of the abandonment, Chrudim (who were declared champions), were selected to play in the 2020–21 UEFA Futsal Champions League by the Football Association of the Czech Republic.
9. England (ENG): The league was abandoned due to the COVID-19 pandemic in England. The top team of the league at the time of the abandonment based on the average number of points per matches played for each team, Helvécia, were selected to play in the 2020–21 UEFA Futsal Champions League by the Football Association.
10. Estonia (EST): The league was abandoned due to the COVID-19 pandemic in Estonia. The top team of the league at the time of the abandonment, Viimsi Smsraha (who were declared champions), were selected to play in the 2020–21 UEFA Futsal Champions League by the Estonian Football Association.
11. Finland (FIN): The league was abandoned due to the COVID-19 pandemic in Finland. The top team of the league at the time of the abandonment, Akaa, were selected to play in the 2020–21 UEFA Futsal Champions League by the Football Association of Finland.
12. France (FRA): The league was abandoned due to the COVID-19 pandemic in France. The top team of the league at the time of the abandonment, ACCS, were selected to play in the 2020–21 UEFA Futsal Champions League by the French Football Federation.
13. Gibraltar (GIB): The league was abandoned due to the COVID-19 pandemic in Gibraltar. The top team of the league at the time of the abandonment, Lynx, were selected to play in the 2020–21 UEFA Futsal Champion's League by the Gibraltar Football Association.
14. Greece (GRE): The league was abandoned due to the COVID-19 pandemic in Greece. The top team of the league at the time of the abandonment, AEK (who were declared champions), were selected to play in the 2020–21 UEFA Futsal Champion's League by the Hellenic Football Federation.
15. Hungary (HUN): The league was abandoned due to the COVID-19 pandemic in Hungary. The top team of the league at the time of the abandonment, MVFC Berettyóújfalu, were selected to play in the 2020–21 UEFA Futsal Champions League by the Hungarian Football Federation.
16. Israel (ISR): The league was abandoned due to the COVID-19 pandemic in Israel. The top team of the league at the time of the abandonment based on the average number of points per matches played for each team, Ashdod Dolphins (who were declared champions), were selected to play in the 2020–21 UEFA Futsal Champions League by the Israel Football Association.
17. Italy (ITA): The league was abandoned due to the COVID-19 pandemic in Italy. The top team of the league at the time of the abandonment, Pesaro, were selected to play in the 2020–21 UEFA Futsal Champions League by the Italian Football Federation.
18. Kazakhstan (KAZ): The league was abandoned due to the COVID-19 pandemic in Kazakhstan. The top two teams of the league at the time of the abandonment, Kairat and Aktobe, were selected to play in the 2020–21 UEFA Futsal Champions League by the Football Federation of Kazakhstan.
19. Lithuania (LTU): The league was abandoned due to the COVID-19 pandemic in Lithuania. The top team of the league at the time of the abandonment, Vytis (who were declared champions), were selected to play in the 2020–21 UEFA Futsal Champions League by the Lithuanian Football Federation.
20. Luxembourg (LUX): The league was abandoned due to the COVID-19 pandemic in Luxembourg. The top team of the league at the time of the abandonment, Differdange 03, were selected to play in the 2020–21 UEFA Futsal Champions League by the Luxembourg Football Federation.
21. Malta (MLT): The league was abandoned due to the COVID-19 pandemic in Malta. The top team of the league at the time of the abandonment, Luxol St Andrews (who were declared champions), were selected to play in the 2020–21 UEFA Futsal Champions League by the Malta Football Association.
22. Netherlands (NED): The league was abandoned due to the COVID-19 pandemic in the Netherlands. The top team of the league at the time of the abandonment, Hovocubo, were selected to play in the 2020–21 UEFA Futsal Champions League by the Royal Dutch Football Association.
23. North Macedonia (MKD): The league was abandoned due to the COVID-19 pandemic in North Macedonia. The top team of the league at the time of the abandonment, Shkupi, were selected to play in the 2020–21 UEFA Futsal Champions League by the Football Federation of North Macedonia.
24. Poland (POL): The league was abandoned due to the COVID-19 pandemic in Poland. The top team of the league at the time of the abandonment, Rekord Bielsko-Biała (who were declared champions), were selected to play in the 2020–21 UEFA Futsal Champions League by the Polish Football Association.
25. Portugal (POR): The league was abandoned due to the COVID-19 pandemic in Portugal. The top two teams of the league at the time of the abandonment, Sporting CP and Benfica, were selected to play in the 2020–21 UEFA Futsal Champions League by the Portuguese Football Federation.
26. Romania (ROU): The league was abandoned due to the COVID-19 pandemic in Romania. The top team of the league at the time of the abandonment, United Galați, were selected to play in the 2020–21 UEFA Futsal Champions League by the Romanian Football Federation.
27. San Marino (SMR): The league was abandoned due to the COVID-19 pandemic in San Marino. The top team of the league at the time of the abandonment, Fiorentino (who were declared champions), were selected to play in the 2020–21 UEFA Futsal Champions League by the San Marino Football Federation.
28. Scotland (SCO): The league was abandoned due to the COVID-19 pandemic in Scotland. The top team of the league at the time of the abandonment based on the average number of points per matches played for each team, PYF Saltires (who were declared champions), were selected to play in the 2020–21 UEFA Futsal Champions League by the Scottish Football Association.
29. Serbia (SRB): The league was abandoned due to the COVID-19 pandemic in Serbia. The top team of the league at the time of the abandonment, Red Star Belgrade (who were declared champions), were selected to play in the 2020–21 UEFA Futsal Champions League by the Football Association of Serbia.
30. Slovakia (SVK): The league was abandoned due to the COVID-19 pandemic in Slovakia. The top team of the league at the time of the abandonment, MIMEL Lučenec (who were declared champions), were selected to play in the 2020–21 UEFA Futsal Champions League by the Slovak Football Association.
31. Slovenia (SVN): The league was abandoned due to the COVID-19 pandemic in Slovenia. The top team of the league at the time of the abandonment, Dobovec, were selected to play in the 2020–21 UEFA Futsal Champions League by the Football Association of Slovenia.
32. Switzerland (SUI): The league was abandoned due to the COVID-19 pandemic in Switzerland. The top team of the league at the time of the abandonment, Minerva, were selected to play in the 2020–21 UEFA Futsal Champions League by the Swiss Football Association.
33. Turkey (TUR): The league was abandoned due to the COVID-19 pandemic in Turkey. The top team of the league at the time of the abandonment, Piyalepaşa, were selected to play in the 2020–21 UEFA Youth League by the Turkish Football Federation.
34. Ukraine (UKR): The league was abandoned due to the COVID-19 pandemic in Ukraine. The top team of the league at the time of the abandonment, Prodexim Kherson (who were declared champions), were selected to play in the 2020–21 UEFA Futsal Champions League by the Ukrainian Association of Football.
35. Wales (WAL): The league was abandoned due to the COVID-19 pandemic in Wales. The top team of the league at the time of the abandonment based on the average number of points per matches played for each team, Swansea University (who were declared champions), were selected to play in the 2020–21 UEFA Futsal Champions League by the Football Association of Wales.

== Schedule ==
The schedule of the competition is as follows (all draws are held at the UEFA headquarters in Nyon, Switzerland, unless stated otherwise). The tournament would have originally started in August 2020, but were initially delayed to October due to the COVID-19 pandemic in Europe. However, due to the continuing pandemic in Europe, UEFA announced a new format and schedule on 16 September 2020. Instead of mini-tournaments (preliminary round, main round, and elite round), all qualifying rounds will be played as single leg knockout matches, and the final tournament will consist of eight instead of four teams. All matches are played behind closed doors until further notice.

Schedule for 2020–21 UEFA Futsal Champions League
Round	Draw	Dates
Preliminary round	27 October 2020	24–29 November 2020
Round of 32	9 December 2020	12–17 January 2021
Round of 16	21 January 2021	16–21 February 2021
Final tournament (quarter-finals, semi-finals, final)	No draw	28 April – 3 May 2021

The schedule of the competition announced in June 2020, under the original format, was as follows (all draws held at the UEFA headquarters in Nyon, Switzerland, unless stated otherwise).

Schedule for 2020–21 UEFA Futsal Champions League (original format)
Round	Draw	Dates
Preliminary round	2 September 2020	13–18 October 2020
Main round	2 September 2020	22–29 November 2020
Elite round	4 December 2020	16–21 February 2021
Final tournament	Early 2021 (Minsk)	Semi-finals: 22 or 23 April 2021 at Minsk Arena, Minsk; Third place match & Final: 24 or 25 April 2021 at Minsk Arena, Minsk

== Preliminary round ==
The draw for the preliminary round was held on 27 October 2020, 13:30 CET.

=== Seeding ===
The 46 teams were seeded based on their UEFA futsal club coefficients. Prior to the draw, teams unable to host (indicated by italics below) notified UEFA accordingly, and UEFA divided the teams into six groups containing an equal number of seeded and unseeded teams, which would be drawn separately. First, a seeded team able to host was drawn against an unseeded team unable to host, with the former to be the home team, until all latter teams were drawn. Next, a seeded team unable to host was drawn against an unseeded team able to host, with the latter to be the home team, until all former teams were drawn. Finally, a seeded team able to host was drawn against an unseeded team able to host, with the first team drawn of the two to be the home team.

Group 1		Group 2		Group 3	
Seeded	Unseeded	Seeded	Unseeded	Seeded	Unseeded
(Czech Republic) Chrudim; (Croatia) Olmissum; (Slovakia) MIMEL Lučenec; (Germany) Hohenstein-Ernstthal	(Latvia) Petrow; (Estonia) Viimsi Smsraha; (Finland) Akaa; (Turkey) Piyalepaşa	(Belarus) Viten Orsha; (Malta) Luxol St Andrews; (Serbia) Red Star Belgrade; (North Macedonia) Shkupi	(France) ACCS; (Austria) Allstars; (Republic of Ireland) Blue Magic; (Bulgaria) Cherno More	(Italy) Pesaro; (Belgium) Charleroi; (Bosnia and Herzegovina) Salines; (Kosovo) Prishtina	(Montenegro) Titograd; (Gibraltar) Lynx; (Albania) Tirana; (Andorra) Encamp
Group 4		Group 5		Group 6	
Seeded	Unseeded	Seeded	Unseeded	Seeded	Unseeded
(Ukraine) Prodexim Kherson; (Armenia) Leo; (Azerbaijan) Araz Naxçivan; (Cyprus) Omonia	(Denmark) Gentofte; (Greece) AEK; (San Marino) Fiorentino; (Northern Ireland) Rosario	(Lithuania) Vytis; (Netherlands) Hovocubo; (Switzerland) Minerva; (England) Helvécia	(Sweden) Hammarby IF; (Norway) Utleira; (Luxembourg) Differdange 03; (Scotland) PYF Saltires	(Poland) Rekord Bielsko-Biała; (Hungary) MVFC Berettyóújfalu; (Romania) United Galați	(Georgia (country)) Tbilisi State University; (Israel) Ashdod Dolphins; (Wales) Swansea University

=== Summary ===
The matches were played between 24 and 29 November 2020.

Team 1	Score	Team 2
Olmissum (Croatia)	9–1	(Estonia) Viimsi Smsraha
Hohenstein-Ernstthal (Germany)	6–2	(Turkey) Piyalepaşa
Petrow (Latvia)	3–4 (a.e.t.)	(Slovakia) MIMEL Lučenec
Chrudim (Czech Republic)	2–1	(Finland) Akaa
Shkupi (North Macedonia)	3–0	(Republic of Ireland) Blue Magic
Allstars (Austria)	2–6	(Malta) Luxol St Andrews
ACCS (France)	7–3	(Serbia) Red Star Belgrade
Viten Orsha (Belarus)	7–0	(Bulgaria) Cherno More
Charleroi (Belgium)	13–1	(Gibraltar) Lynx
Prishtina (Kosovo)	3–0	(Albania) Tirana
Titograd (Montenegro)	0–6	(Italy) Pesaro
Encamp (Andorra)	3–10	(Bosnia and Herzegovina) Salines
Omonia (Cyprus)	6–0	(San Marino) Fiorentino
Prodexim Kherson (Ukraine)	28–1	(Northern Ireland) Rosario
Gentofte (Denmark)	5–0 (awd.) (Note: The preliminary round match between Gentofte and Leo was cancelled due to Leo refusing to travel to Denmark for the match. The match was awarded as a 5–0 win for Gentofte.)	(Armenia) Leo
AEK (Greece)	3–3 (a.e.t.) (4–3 p)	(Azerbaijan) Araz Naxçivan
Minerva (Switzerland)	5–0 (awd.) (Note: The preliminary round match between Minerva and PYF Saltires was cancelled due to PYF Saltires refusing to travel to Switzerland for the match. The match was awarded as a 5–0 win for Minerva.)	(Scotland) PYF Saltires
Vytis (Lithuania)	3–1	(Sweden) Hammarby IF
Differdange 03 (Luxembourg)	6–0	(England) Helvécia
Utleira (Norway)	0–11	(Netherlands) Hovocubo
Rekord Bielsko-Biała (Poland)	6–0	(Wales) Swansea University
United Galați (Romania)	1–0	(Israel) Ashdod Dolphins
Tbilisi State University (Georgia (country))	3–4	(Hungary) MVFC Berettyóújfalu

=== Matches ===
Times are CET (UTC+1), as listed by UEFA (local times, if different, are in parentheses).

28 November 2020
20:00

Olmissum (Croatia)	9–1	(Estonia) Viimsi Smsraha
Jurlina 1:08, 39:05; Horvat 4:15; Pavić 5:39; Kustura 12:54, 35:30; Merkurjev 13:19 (o.g.); Juretić 17:55; Jurić 20:41	Report	Merkurjev 35:55 (pen.)

Sportska Dvorana Ribnjak, Omiš
Attendance: 0
Referee: Martin Matula (Slovakia), Peter Budáč (Slovakia)

28 November 2020
16:15

Hohenstein-Ernstthal (Germany)	6–2	(Turkey) Piyalepaşa
Klima 10:10; Wittig 15:38; Oliveira 23:10; Fogaca Valente 25:24, 39:22; Míča 33:55	Report	Altunay 3:25; Can Vardar 37:03

HOT-Sportzentrum, Hohenstein-Ernstthal
Attendance: 0
Referee: David Urdánoz Apezteguía (Spain), Javier Moreno Reina (Spain)

28 November 2020
12:00 (13:00 EET)

Petrow (Latvia)	3–4 (a.e.t.)	(Slovakia) MIMEL Lučenec
Jerofejevs 10:53; Mi. Babris 33:33; Seņs 39:54	Report	Serbin 6:36, 48:29; Brunovský 13:49; Rafael 22:42

Zemgale Olympic Center, Jelgava
Attendance: 0
Referee: Jacob Pawlowski (Germany), Christian Gundler (Germany)

28 November 2020
19:00

Chrudim (Czech Republic)	2–1	(Finland) Akaa
Stankovic 4:45 (o.g.); Slováček 17:37	Report	Grönholm 30:29

Sports Hall Chrudim, Chrudim
Attendance: 0
Referee: Murat Çolak (Turkey), Fatma Özlem Tursun (Turkey)

29 November 2020
19:45

Shkupi (North Macedonia)	3–0	(Republic of Ireland) Blue Magic
Seferi 6:05 (pen.); Lemes Soares 29:50 (o.g.); Nezir 39:46	Report

Boris Trajkovski Sports Center, Skopje
Attendance: 0
Referee: Julien Lang (France), Aurélien Uzan (France)

28 November 2020
14:00

Allstars (Austria)	2–6	(Malta) Luxol St. Andrews
Lokovšek 0:20; Yörük 31:55	Report	Nikvashvili 5:56, 39:45; Alves 7:10, 27:46; Maikinho 21:53; Vevé 27:17

Landessportzentrum VIVA, Steinbrunn
Attendance: 0
Referee: Raafat Al Hamola (Israel), Idan Berenshtein (Israel)

25 November 2020
19:00

ACCS (France)	7–3	(Serbia) Red Star Belgrade
Lutin 11:15, 13:43, 27:43; Mohammed 16:53, 31:58; Coelho 19:50; Belhaj 26:02	Report	Perić 12:57; Stojčevski 20:28, 27:11

Teddy Riner Arena, Asnières-sur-Seine
Attendance: 0
Referee: Ruben António Cardoso Santos (Portugal), Filipe Gonçalo Santos Duarte (Portugal)

28 November 2020
14:00 (16:00 FET)

Viten Orsha (Belarus)	7–0	(Bulgaria) Cherno More
Kozel 13:33, 14:00, 17:37, 18:09; Rogovik 15:17; Peremitin 31:51, 34:17	Report

Olympic Stadium, Mogilev
Attendance: 0
Referee: David Grøndal Nissen (Denmark), Martin Køster (Denmark)

27 November 2020
20:00

Charleroi (Belgium)	13–1	(Gibraltar) Lynx
Ghislandi 1:41, 11:44, 38:01; El Fakiri 4:57, 15:07; Canaris 13:32; Salhi 21:08; Rahou 24:24; Adnane 26:06, 26:42; Dahbi Reda 29:48; Chaibai 30:30, 39:43	Report	Sánchez 8:39

La Garenne, Charleroi
Attendance: 0
Referee: Norbert Szilágyi (Hungary), Dario Pezzuto (Italy)

25 November 2020
20:00

Prishtina (Kosovo)	3–0	(Albania) Tirana
Dervishaj 10:28, 34:04; Rukovci 24:47	Report

Palace of Youth and Sports, Pristina
Attendance: 0
Referee: Ingus Puriņš (Latvia), Eduards Fatkuļins (Latvia)

28 November 2020
19:00

Titograd (Montenegro)	0–6	(Italy) Pesaro
	Report	Marcelo 1:58; Júlio 8:02; Borruto 12:43; Canal 14:46; Fortini 20:12; Honorio 27:41

Verde Complex, Podgorica
Attendance: 0
Referee: Bogdan Valentin Hanceariuc (Romania), Liviu Dumitru Chita (Romania)

28 November 2020
19:00

Encamp (Andorra)	3–10	(Bosnia and Herzegovina) Salines
Saviola 29:07, 29:58; Alves 33:13	Report	Sesar 1:26, 8:13, 13:44, 24:17; Matijević 12:52; Imširović 15:16; Mataja 26:02, 34:57; Avdić 26:49; Šešelj 27:46

Centre Esportiu i Socio Cultural d'Encamp, Encamp
Attendance: 0
Referee: Vitali Rakutski (Belarus), Volha Pauliuts (Belarus)

26 November 2020
15:00 (16:00 EET)

Omonia (Cyprus)	6–0	(San Marino) Fiorentino
Manoli 19:35, 32:27; Mantelli 20:38, 20:53; Preá 31:30; El Kebbe 34:51	Report

Eleftheria Indoor Hall, Nicosia
Attendance: 0
Referee: Omar Rafiq (Norway), Telmen Undrakh (Norway)

28 November 2020
13:00 (14:00 EET)

Prodexim Kherson (Ukraine)	28–1	(Northern Ireland) Rosario
Roninho 4:31, 15:53, 21:11, 26:06; Shoturma 5:18, 5:41, 13:55, 14:16, 23:52, 30:47, 37:19; Korsun 6:46; Bilotserkivets 7:58; Claudio 10:20, 10:34, 26:44; Maievskyi 11:06, 38:59; Sorokin 22:26, 34:25; Zvarych 29:32; Volianiuk 32:46, 39:05; Mospan 33:30, 38:19, 39:40; Da Rosa 35:12; Volkov 38:45	Report	Baggley 20:50

SK Black Lake PSV, Odesa
Attendance: 0
Referee: Lars Van Leeuwen (Netherlands), Jacob Willem Machiel Van Dijke (Netherlands)

25 November 2020
16:00

Gentofte (Denmark)	5–0 Awarded	(Armenia) Leo
	Report

Gentoftehallen, Gentofte

28 November 2020
13:30 (14:30 EET)

AEK (Greece)	3–3 (a.e.t.)	(Azerbaijan) Araz Naxçivan
Manos 0:48; Panou 19:59, 27:18	Report	Farzaliyev 23:51; Atayev 32:49; Chovdarov 36:02
Penalties
Asimakopoulos (penalty scored); Manos (penalty scored); Panou (penalty scored); Delaportas (penalty missed); Tarnanidis (penalty scored)	4–3	(penalty missed) Baghirov; (penalty scored) Chovdarov; (penalty scored) Borges Souza; (penalty scored) Farzaliyev; (penalty missed) Atayev

Dais Sports Hall, Athens
Attendance: 0
Referee: Carl Hughes (Wales), Valentin Ciuplea (Wales)

26 November 2020
19:00

Minerva (Switzerland)	5–0 Awarded	(Scotland) PYF Saltires
	Report

Sporthalle Weissenstein, Bern

24 November 2020
19:00 (20:00 EET)

Vytis (Lithuania)	3–1	(Sweden) Hammarby IF
Reimaris 7:37, 8:27; Sendžikas 16:20	Report	Yasar 5:13

Jonava Sports Arena, Jonava
Attendance: 0
Referee: David Schaerli (Switzerland), Adrian Tschopp (Switzerland)

29 November 2020
16:30

Differdange 03 (Luxembourg)	6–0	(England) Helvécia
Fredy 12:47, 22:46, 34:17; Djô 23:11; Teka 25:42, 38:23	Report

Complexe Sportif Cosnes-et-Romain, Cosnes-et-Romain (France) (Note: The preliminary round match between Differdange 03 and Helvecia was played in France due to restrictions related to the COVID-19 pandemic in Luxembourg.)
Attendance: 0
Referee: Kaloyan Kirilov (Bulgaria), Ivo Tsenov (Bulgaria)

28 November 2020
16:00

Utleira (Norway)	0–11	(Netherlands) Hovocubo
	Report	Mellah 0:37, 31:01; Velseboer 4:41, 33:37; Aklalouch 11:00; Daari 16:55; Bouyouzan 19:55 (2pen.); Charraoui 20:38, 21:09; Attahiri 21:46, 38:26

Utleirahallen, Trondheim
Attendance: 0
Referee: Sviatoslav Kliuchnyk (Ukraine), Denys Kutsyi (Ukraine)

25 November 2020
18:00

Rekord Bielsko-Biała (Poland)	6–0	(Wales) Swansea University
Ribeiro 4:46; Popławski 14:58; Budniak 19:28; Johnston 23:05 (o.g.); Viana 24:59, 34:32	Report

Pod Debowcem Hall, Bielsko-Biała
Attendance: 0
Referee: Grigori Ošomkov (Estonia), Jagnar Jakobson (Estonia)

29 November 2020
15:00 (16:00 EET)

United Galați (Romania)	1–0	(Israel) Ashdod Dolphins
Cires 11:58	Report

Sala Sporturilor Dunarea, Galați
Attendance: 0
Referee: Irina Velikanova (Russia), Tatiana Boltneva (Russia)

28 November 2020
13:00 (16:00 GET)

Tbilisi State University (Georgia (country))	3–4	(Hungary) MVFC Berettyóújfalu
Kekelia 30:52; Ghavtadze 37:54; Jvarashvili 39:50	Report	Alvarito 3:56 (pen.), 28:35; Fernandes 6:39; Szabó 28:09

Tbilisi New Sports Palace, Tbilisi
Attendance: 0
Referee: Chiara Perona (Italy), Shota Kukhilava (Georgia)

== Round of 32 ==
The draw for the round of 32 was held on 9 December 2020, 14:00 CET.

=== Seeding ===
The 32 teams, including the nine teams which received a bye (indicated by bold below) and the 23 winners of the preliminary round, were seeded based on their UEFA futsal club coefficients (the title holders were automatically seeded first). Prior to the draw, teams unable to host (indicated by italics below) notified UEFA accordingly, and UEFA divided the teams into four groups containing an equal number of seeded and unseeded teams, which would be drawn separately. First, a seeded team able to host was drawn against an unseeded team unable to host, with the former to be the home team, until all latter teams were drawn. Next, a seeded team unable to host was drawn against an unseeded team able to host, with the latter to be the home team, until all former teams were drawn. Finally, a seeded team able to host was drawn against an unseeded team able to host, with the first team drawn of the two to be the home team.

Group 1		Group 2	
Seeded	Unseeded	Seeded	Unseeded
(Spain) Barcelona; (Portugal) Benfica; (Slovenia) Dobovec; (Czech Republic) Chrudim	(Malta) Luxol St Andrews; (Switzerland) Minerva; (Kosovo) Prishtina; (Luxembourg) Differdange 03	(Spain) Inter FS; (Portugal) Sporting CP; (Italy) Pesaro; (Croatia) Olmissum	(Belgium) Charleroi; (Netherlands) Hovocubo; (France) ACCS; (Denmark) Gentofte
Group 3		Group 4	
Seeded	Unseeded	Seeded	Unseeded
(Kazakhstan) Kairat; (Kazakhstan) Aktobe; (Ukraine) Prodexim Kherson; (Lithuania) Vytis	(Belarus) Viten Orsha; (Germany) Hohenstein-Ernstthal; (North Macedonia) Shkupi; (Greece) AEK	(Russia) KPRF; (Russia) Gazprom-Ugra Yugorsk; (Poland) Rekord Bielsko-Biała; (Hungary) MVFC Berettyóújfalu	(Slovakia) MIMEL Lučenec; (Romania) United Galați; (Bosnia and Herzegovina) Salines; (Cyprus) Omonia

=== Summary ===
The matches were played on 15 and 16 January 2021.

Team 1	Score	Team 2
Barcelona (Spain)	9–2	(Kosovo) Prishtina
Luxol St Andrews (Malta)	2–3	(Slovenia) Dobovec
Minerva (Switzerland)	1–5	(Portugal) Benfica
Chrudim (Czech Republic)	4–0	(Luxembourg) Differdange 03
Inter FS (Spain)	6–2	(Netherlands) Hovocubo
ACCS (France)	2–2 (a.e.t.) (8–7 p)	(Italy) Pesaro
Olmissum (Croatia)	4–1	(Belgium) Charleroi
Sporting CP (Portugal)	12–1	(Denmark) Gentofte
AEK (Greece)	2–5	(Kazakhstan) Aktobe
Viten Orsha (Belarus)	3–5	(Kazakhstan) Kairat
Prodexim Kherson (Ukraine)	5–1	(North Macedonia) Shkupi
Hohenstein-Ernstthal (Germany)	0–2	(Lithuania) Vytis
Salines (Bosnia and Herzegovina)	2–5	(Russia) Gazprom-Ugra Yugorsk
MIMEL Lučenec (Slovakia)	1–7	(Russia) KPRF
Omonia (Cyprus)	0–2	(Hungary) MVFC Berettyóújfalu
Rekord Bielsko-Biała (Poland)	3–6	(Romania) United Galați

=== Matches ===
Times are CET (UTC+1), as listed by UEFA (local times, if different, are in parentheses).

15 January 2021
18:30

Barcelona (Spain)	9–2	(Kosovo) Prishtina
Dyego 11:35; Esquerdinha 13:03, 20:58, 30:26; Shiraishi 15:10; Joselito 16:26; Rodrigues 18:41; Povill 32:15, 37:50	Report	Dervishaj 17:45; Ibiši 25:24

Palau Blaugrana, Barcelona
Referee: Daniel Decă (Romania), Liviu Dumitru Chita (Romania)

16 January 2021
18:00

Luxol St Andrews (Malta)	2–3	(Slovenia) Dobovec
Alves 2:01; Vevé 19:00	Report	Perić 16:00, 23:18; Novak 39:06

Tal-Qroqq University Sports Hall, Gżira
Referee: Michael Christofides (Cyprus), Nicolas Nicolaou (Cyprus)

16 January 2021
19:00

Minerva (Switzerland)	1–5	(Portugal) Benfica
Mezger 37:49	Report	Arthur 4:26, 18:53; Brito 23:33; Chishkala 27:09; Jacaré 39:56

Sporthalle Weissenstein, Bern
Referee: Tomasz Frąk (Poland), Damian Grabowski (Poland)

16 January 2021
19:00

Chrudim (Czech Republic)	4–0	(Luxembourg) Differdange 03
D. Drozd 2:50, 17:42; P. Drozd 19:45; Koudelka 39:10	Report

Sports Hall Chrudim, Chrudim
Referee: Farik Kečo (Bosnia and Herzegovina), Igor Puzović (Bosnia and Herzegovina)

16 January 2021
12:00

Inter FS (Spain)	6–2	(Netherlands) Hovocubo
Eric 4:03; Bruninho 11:57; Fernando 14:52; Pito 22:47; Cecilio 31:45; Borja 37:23	Report	Aklalouch 18:03; Velseboer 24:31

Pabellón Jorge Garbajosa, Torrejón de Ardoz
Referee: Vedran Babić (Croatia), Josip Dujmić (Croatia)

16 January 2021
19:00

ACCS (France)	2–2 (a.e.t.)	(Italy) Pesaro
Mohammed 36:52, 46:36	Report	Borruto 19:04; Marcelo 47:27
Penalties
Mouhoudine (penalty scored); Mohammed (penalty scored); Ricardinho (penalty scored); Bakkali (penalty scored); Ortiz (penalty missed); Belhaj (penalty scored); Lutin (penalty scored); El Mesrar (penalty scored); N'Gala (penalty scored)	8–7	(penalty scored) Salas; (penalty scored) Júlio; (penalty scored) Jefferson; (penalty scored) Cuzzolino; (penalty missed) Marcelo; (penalty scored) Canal; (penalty scored) Fortini; (penalty scored) Tonidandel; (penalty missed) Honorio

Teddy Riner Arena, Asnières-sur-Seine
Referee: Borislav Kolev (Bulgaria), Trayan Enchev (Bulgaria)

16 January 2021
19:00

Olmissum (Croatia)	4–1	(Belgium) Charleroi
Jurić 21:28, 34:42; Perišić 32:14, 38:57	Report	Rahou 33:11

Sportska Dvorana Ribnjak, Omiš
Referee: Adrian Tschopp (Switzerland), Marco Rothenfluh (Switzerland)

16 January 2021
16:00 (15:00 WET)

Sporting CP (Portugal)	12–1	(Denmark) Gentofte
Zicky 2:18; Erick 5:56; Taynan 7:13; Cardinal 15:27, 35:11; Cavinato 22:27, 32:00; T. Paçó 23:49, 31:41; Turé 29:38; Varela 33:36; Pauleta 39:07	Report	El-Ouaz 21:28

Pavilhão João Rocha, Lisbon
Referee: Norbert Szilágyi (Hungary), Annamária Tolnay (Hungary)

16 January 2021
14:00 (15:00 EET)

AEK (Greece)	2–5	(Kazakhstan) Aktobe
Gousis 17:41; Panou 33:26 (pen.)	Report	Dauletov 16:42; Vitão 21:18; Klochko 27:30; Kulbayev 32:00; Karagulov 36:06

Dais Sports Hall, Athens
Referee: Clinton Mario Cassar (Malta), Stephen Vella (Malta)

16 January 2021
12:00 (14:00 FET)

Viten Orsha (Belarus)	3–5	(Kazakhstan) Kairat
Peremitin 27:20; Kozel 33:25; Gusakov 35:39	Report	Valadares 0:11; Humberto 15:24; Fávero 17:48; Orazov 33:39; Douglas Júnior 38:04

Olympic Stadium, Mogilev
Referee: Radim Čep (Czech Republic), Filip Nešněra (Czech Republic)

16 January 2021
13:00 (14:00 EET)

Prodexim Kherson (Ukraine)	5–1	(North Macedonia) Shkupi
Zvarych 1:26; Bilotserkivets 2:01, 33:43; Claudio 36:33; Da Rosa 39:27	Report	Claudio 33:37 (o.g.)

Yunist Sports Palace, Zaporizhzhia
Referee: Volha Pauliuts (Belarus), Anatol Ustsuizhanin (Belarus)

16 January 2021
16:15

Hohenstein-Ernstthal (Germany)	0–2	(Lithuania) Vytis
	Report	Zagurskas 28:28; Sendžikas 37:06

HOT-Sportzentrum, Hohenstein-Ernstthal
Referee: Uğur Çakmak (Turkey), Fatma Özlem Tursun (Turkey)

16 January 2021
19:00

FC Salines (Bosnia and Herzegovina)	2–5	(Russia) Gazprom-Ugra Yugorsk
Arnautović 8:38; Bolinha 21:54	Report	Davydov 6:32; Ponkratov 27:14; Afanasyev 28:24; Kupatadze 31:51, 39:45

Arena Hills, Sarajevo
Referee: Yasin Alageyik (Belgium), Jiri Bergs (Belgium)

16 January 2021
17:00

MIMEL Lučenec (Slovakia)	1–7	(Russia) KPRF
Torres 29:31	Report	Serbin 4:39 (o.g.); Paulinho 10:46; Gómez 12:22, 38:51; Bagirov 16:09; Asadov 16:44 (2pen.); Nando 17:41 (pen.)

Športová hala Arena, Lučenec
Referee: Šarūnas Tamulynas (Lithuania), Mantas Pomeckis (Lithuania)

16 January 2021
19:00 (20:00 EET)

Omonia (Cyprus)	0–2	(Hungary) MVFC Berettyóújfalu
	Report	Szabó 3:07; Rábl 24:50

Eleftheria Indoor Hall, Nicosia
Referee: Vasilios Christodoulis (Greece), Antonios Adamopoulos (Greece)

16 January 2021
16:00

Rekord Bielsko-Biała (Poland)	3–6	(Romania) United Galați
Popławski 9:08, 19:55; Biel 37:51	Report	Araújo 5:15, 10:22, 31:32, 34:22, 39:25; Ignat 35:58

Pod Debowcem Hall, Bielsko-Biała
Referee: Ingo Heemsoth (Germany), Jacob Pawlowski (Germany)

== Round of 16 ==
The draw for the round of 16 was held on 21 January 2021, 14:00 CET.

=== Seeding ===
The 16 winners of the round of 32 were seeded based on their UEFA futsal club coefficients (the title holders, should they qualify, were automatically seeded first). A seeded team was drawn against an unseeded team, with the first team drawn of the two to be the home team. Based on political restrictions, teams from Russia and Ukraine could not be drawn against each other.

Seeded	Unseeded
(Spain) Barcelona; (Spain) Inter FS; (Portugal) Sporting CP; (Kazakhstan) Kairat; (Portugal) Benfica; (Russia) KPRF; (Russia) Gazprom-Ugra Yugorsk; (Kazakhstan) Aktobe	(Slovenia) Dobovec; (Ukraine) Prodexim Kherson; (Czech Republic) Chrudim; (Lithuania) Vytis; (Croatia) Olmissum; (Hungary) MVFC Berettyóújfalu; (Romania) United Galați; (France) ACCS

=== Summary ===
The matches were played on 18, 19 and 20 February 2021.

Team 1	Score	Team 2
Inter FS (Spain)	4–2	(Ukraine) Prodexim Kherson
Aktobe (Kazakhstan)	1–2	(Slovenia) Dobovec
Kairat (Kazakhstan)	6–1	(Romania) United Galați
Olmissum (Croatia)	1–2	(Russia) KPRF
Benfica (Portugal)	5–0	(Hungary) MVFC Berettyóújfalu
Gazprom-Ugra Yugorsk (Russia)	3–0	(Lithuania) Vytis
Barcelona (Spain)	2–1	(France) ACCS
Sporting CP (Portugal)	5–1	(Czech Republic) Chrudim

=== Matches ===
Times are CET (UTC+1), as listed by UEFA (local times, if different, are in parentheses).

19 February 2021
19:00

Inter FS (Spain)	4–2	(Ukraine) Prodexim Kherson
Saldise 15:30; Borja 32:19; Cecilio 38:46; Jesús 39:09	Report	Zvarych 30:08; Pola 33:00 (o.g.)

Pabellón Jorge Garbajosa, Torrejón de Ardoz
Referee: Ondřej Černý (Czech Republic), Gábor Kovács (Hungary)

18 February 2021
11:00 (16:00 ALMT)

Aktobe (Kazakhstan)	1–2	(Slovenia) Dobovec
Vitão 8:32	Report	Matošević 20:27; Duščak 23:02

Nur-Aman Sport and Recreation Center, Almaty
Referee: Angelo Galante (Italy), Dario Pezzuto (Italy)

20 February 2021
13:00 (18:00 ALMT)

Kairat (Kazakhstan)	6–1	(Romania) United Galați
Rangel 3:54; Valadares 11:17; Fernandinho 22:48; Edson 28:14; Yesenamanov 33:05; Orazov 39:44	Report	Craciun 37:38

Nur-Aman Sport and Recreation Center, Almaty
Referee: Vladimir Kadykov (Russia), Ivan Shabanov (Russia)

20 February 2021
19:30

Olmissum (Croatia)	1–2	(Russia) KPRF
Pavić 8:09	Report	Asadov 8:41, 34:37

Sportska Dvorana Ribnjak, Omiš
Referee: Cristiano José Cardoso Santos (Portugal), Ruben António Cardoso Santos (Portugal)

20 February 2021
20:00 (19:00 WET)

Benfica (Portugal)	5–0	(Hungary) MVFC Berettyóújfalu
Robinho 1:40; Miguel 5:53; Chishkala 25:09; Jacaré 30:04; Cecílio 33:58	Report

Pavilhão Fidelidade, Lisbon
Referee: Cédric Pelissier (France), Victor Berg-Audic (France)

20 February 2021
13:00 (15:00 MSK)

Gazprom-Ugra Yugorsk (Russia)	3–0	(Lithuania) Vytis
Afanasyev 13:16; Pirogov 17:04; Vinogradov 24:38	Report

Triumph Sports Palace, Lyubertsy
Referee: Admir Zahović (Slovenia), Aleš Močnik Perič (Slovenia)

19 February 2021
21:05

Barcelona (Spain)	2–1	(France) ACCS
Ferrão 18:58; Ximbinha 34:47	Report	Eduardo 8:22

Palau Blaugrana, Barcelona
Referee: Nikola Jelić (Croatia), Borislav Kolev (Bulgaria)

20 February 2021
18:00 (17:00 WET)

Sporting CP (Portugal)	5–1	(Czech Republic) Chrudim
T. Paçó 8:57, 32:02; Cavinato 11:03; Erick 33:08; Rocha 35:04	Report	Everton 19:09 (pen.)

Pavilhão João Rocha, Lisbon
Referee: Alejandro Martinez Flores (Spain), Javier Moreno Reina (Spain)

== Final tournament ==
The eight winners of the round of 16 played in the final tournament, which consisted of the quarter-finals, semi-finals and final (with no third place match unlike previous tournaments), between 28 April and 3 May 2021, at the Krešimir Ćosić Hall in Zadar, Croatia.

=== Seeding ===
The eight teams were seeded 1–8 based on their UEFA futsal club coefficients (the title holders were automatically seeded first).

In the following table, finals or final tournaments until 2018 were in the Futsal Cup era, since 2019 were in the UEFA Futsal Champions League era. All appearances in two-legged finals (2003–2006) or final tournaments (2002: eight-team finals, 2007–2020: four-team finals) are counted.

Seed	Team	Coeff.	Previous final or final tournament appearances (bold indicates winners, italic indicates hosts or co-hosts)
1	(Spain) Barcelona (title holders)	69.001	7 (**2012**, 2013, **2014**, 2015, 2018, 2019, **2020**)
2	(Spain) Inter FS	60.667	9 (**2004**, **2006**, 2007, **2009**, 2010, 2016, **2017**, **2018**, 2019)
3	(Portugal) Sporting CP	57.999	7 (2002, 2011, 2012, 2015, 2017, 2018, **2019**)
4	(Kazakhstan) Kairat	35.667	8 (2008, 2009, 2011, **2013**, 2014, **2015**, 2017, 2019)
5	(Portugal) Benfica	33.332	4 (2004, **2010**, 2011, 2016)
6	(Russia) KPRF	24.000	1 (2020)
7	(Russia) Gazprom-Ugra Yugorsk	20.333	2 (**2016**, 2017)
8	(Slovenia) Dobovec	14.501	None

=== Bracket ===
The bracket of the final tournament was determined by the seeding, without any draw, as follows (Regulations Articles 14.02, 14.03 and 14.04):

Round	Matches
Quarter-finals	Quarter-final 1: Seed 1 vs. Seed 8; Quarter-final 2: Seed 2 vs. Seed 7; Quarter-final 3: Seed 3 vs. Seed 6; Quarter-final 4: Seed 4 vs. Seed 5
Semi-finals	Semi-final 1: Winner quarter-final 1 vs. Winner quarter-final 4; Semi-final 2: Winner quarter-final 2 vs. Winner quarter-final 3
Final	Winner semi-final 1 vs. Winner semi-final 2

Quarter-finals
28 April – Zadar
**(Spain) Barcelona**	**2**
(Slovenia) Dobovec	0
28 April – Zadar
**(Kazakhstan) Kairat (a.e.t.)**	**6**
(Portugal) Benfica	2
29 April – Zadar
**(Spain) Inter FS**	**3**
(Russia) Gazprom-Ugra Yugorsk	0
29 April – Zadar
**(Portugal) Sporting CP**	**3**
(Russia) KPRF	2

Semi-finals
1 May – Zadar
**(Spain) Barcelona**	**3**
(Kazakhstan) Kairat	2
1 May – Zadar
(Spain) Inter FS	2
**(Portugal) Sporting CP**	**5**

Final
3 May – Zadar
(Spain) Barcelona	3
**(Portugal) Sporting CP**	**4**

Times are CEST (UTC+2), as listed by UEFA.

=== Quarter-finals ===
28 April 2021
15:00

Kairat (Kazakhstan)	6–2 (a.e.t.)	(Portugal) Benfica
Gadeia 15:04, 46:48 (p); Edson 30:36; Tursagulov 44:33; Fernandinho 48:48; Orazov 49:57	Report	Afonso Jesus 15:34; Tiago Brito 34:32

Krešimir Ćosić Hall, Zadar
Attendance: 0
Referee: Nikola Jelić (Croatia), Borislav Kolev (Bulgaria)

28 April 2021
20:00

Barcelona (Spain)	2–0	(Slovenia) Dobovec
Ferrão 8:57; Aicardo 11:45	Report

Krešimir Ćosić Hall, Zadar
Attendance: 0
Referee: Ondřej Černý (Czech Republic), Gábor Kovács (Hungary)

29 April 2021
15:00

Inter FS (Spain)	3–0	(Russia) Gazprom-Ugra Yugorsk
Cecílio 15:51, 37:01; Tripodi 33:07	Report

Krešimir Ćosić Hall, Zadar
Attendance: 0
Referee: Angelo Galante (Italy), Nicola Manzione (Italy)

29 April 2021
20:00

Sporting CP (Portugal)	3–2	(Russia) KPRF
Cavinato 1:34, 14:23; Vinícius Rocha 15:35	Report	Niyazov 8:19; Asadov 14:02

Krešimir Ćosić Hall, Zadar
Attendance: 0
Referee: Cédric Pelissier (France), Victor Berg-Audic (France)

=== Semi-finals ===
1 May 2021
15:00

Inter FS (Spain)	2–5	(Portugal) Sporting CP
Borja 11:38; Tomás Paçó 31:45 (o.g.)	Report	Cavinato 1:24; Guitta 11:54; Taynan 23:13; Pany Varela 34:15; Erick 39:54

Krešimir Ćosić Hall, Zadar
Attendance: 0
Referee: Angelo Galante (Italy), Gábor Kovács (Hungary)

1 May 2021
20:00

Barcelona (Spain)	3–2	(Kazakhstan) Kairat
Ferrão 15:35, 20:53, 32:51	Report	Fávero 24:05; Fernandinho 35:31

Krešimir Ćosić Hall, Zadar
Attendance: 0
Referee: Cédric Pelissier (France), Ondřej Černý (Czech Republic)

=== Final ===
3 May 2021
20:00

Barcelona (Spain)	3–4	(Portugal) Sporting CP
Marcênio 0:51; Ximbinha 17:54; Ferrão 37:05	Report	Zicky 25:48; Erick 27:19; João Matos 30:16; Pauleta 36:26

Krešimir Ćosić Hall, Zadar
Attendance: 0
Referee: Nikola Jelić (Croatia), Borislav Kolev (Bulgaria)

== Top goalscorers ==
Rank	Player	Team	Total
1	(Ukraine) Petro Shoturma	(Ukraine) Prodexim Kherson	7
2	(Italy) Diego Cavinato	(Portugal) Sporting CP	6
2	(Brazil) Ferrão	(Spain) Barcelona	6
4	(Brazil) Daniel Araújo	(Romania) United Galați	5
4	(Belarus) Artem Kozel	(Belarus) Viten Orsha	5
6	(Brazil) Luiz Garcia Claudio	(Ukraine) Prodexim Kherson	4
6	(France) Abdessamad Mohammed	(France) ACCS	4
6	(Portugal) Tomás Paçó	(Portugal) Sporting CP	4
6	(Georgia (country)) Roninho	(Ukraine) Prodexim Kherson	4
6	(Bosnia and Herzegovina) Josip Sesar	(Bosnia and Herzegovina) Salines	4
