= 2003–04 UEFA Futsal Cup =

Final positions
- Champions: (Spain) Interviú
- Runners-up: (Portugal) Benfica

The 2003–04 UEFA Futsal Cup was the 18th edition of Europe's premier club futsal tournament and the 3rd edition under the current UEFA Futsal Cup format.

== Preliminary round ==
Date	Team #1	Score	Team #2
07.09.2003	(England) Tranmere Victoria	1–7	(Romania) ACS Odorheiu Secuiesc
14.09.2003	(Romania) ACS Odorheiu Secuiesc	10–1	(England) Tranmere Victoria

== First qualifying round ==
Key to colours in group tables
Teams progressed to the Second qualifying round

=== Group 1 ===
Team	Pts	Pld	W	D	L	GF	GA
(Spain) Playas de Castellon	9	3	3	0	0	24	4
(Hungary) Üllő FC Cső-Montage	6	3	2	0	1	12	6
(Israel) Peace Team Beer Sheva	3	3	1	0	2	8	11
(Cyprus) Ararat Nicosia	0	3	0	0	3	2	25

Üllő FC	2–0	Beer Sheva
Castellon	11–0	Ararat
Üllő FC	9–0	Ararat
Beer Sheva	3–7	Castellon
Ararat	2–5	Beer Sheva
Castellon	6–1	Ullo FC

=== Group 2 ===
Team	Pts	Pld	W	D	L	GF	GA
(Croatia) MNK Split	9	3	3	0	0	19	3
(Belarus) Dorozhnik Minsk	6	3	2	0	1	13	8
(Romania) ACS Odorheiu Secuiesc	1	3	0	1	2	5	11
(Finland) Golden Futsal Team	1	3	0	1	2	5	20

Split	9–0	Golden FT
Minsk	3–1	Odorheiu
Golden FT	2–8	Minsk
Split	5–1	Odorheiu
Odorheiu	3–3	Golden FT
Minsk	2–5	Split

=== Group 3 ===
Team	Pts	Pld	W	D	L	GF	GA
(Spain) Boomerang Interviú	9	3	3	0	0	38	3
(Lithuania) Inkaras Kaunas	6	3	2	0	1	10	8
(Georgia (country)) Iberia Tbilisi	3	3	1	0	2	12	16
(Bulgaria) KMF VIP Sofia	0	3	0	0	3	5	38

Interviu	11–3	Iberia
Inkaras	8–2	VIP
VIP	0–22	Interviu
Inkaras	2–1	Iberia
Iberia	8–3	VIP
Interviu	5–0	Inkaras

=== Group 4 ===
Team	Pts	Pld	W	D	L	GF	GA
(Italy) Prato Calcio a 5	6	3	2	0	1	18	14
(Azerbaijan) FC AMMK Baku	5	3	1	2	0	13	11
(Slovakia) ŠK Program Dubnica	4	3	1	1	1	8	8
(Latvia) FK Oma Riga	1	3	0	1	2	10	16

Prato	4–1	Dubnica
AMMK	3–3	Oma
Prato	7–4	Oma
Dubnica	1–1	AMMK
AMMK	9–7	Prato
Oma	3–6	Dubnica

=== Group 5 ===
Team	Pts	Pld	W	D	L	GF	GA
(Ukraine) InterKrAZ Kiev	9	3	3	0	0	22	1
(North Macedonia) KMF Skopje	6	3	2	0	1	10	4
(Andorra) UE Santa Coloma	3	3	1	0	2	4	23
(Czech Republic) Nejzbach Vysoké Mýto	0	3	0	0	3	1	9

Nejzbach	0–3 (t)	Santa Coloma
InterKrAZ	3–0 (t)	Skopje
InterKrAZ	16–1	Santa Coloma
Skopje	3–1	Nejzbach
Nejzbach	0–3	InterKrAZ
Santa Coloma	0–7	Skopje

=== Group 6 ===
Team	Pts	Pld	W	D	L	GF	GA
(Belgium) Action 21 Charleroi	9	3	3	0	0	61	6
(Moldova) Zaria Bălţi	6	3	2	0	1	25	17
(Poland) P.A. Nova Gliwice	3	3	1	0	2	15	12
(Albania) FC Olimpic Tirana	0	3	0	0	3	10	76

Olimpic	3–44	Charleroi
Gliwice	1–4	Balty
Charleroi	10–3	Bălţi
Gliwice	14–1	Olimpic
Bălţi	18–6	Olimpic
Charleroi	7–0	Gliwice

=== Group 7 ===
Team	Pts	Pld	W	D	L	GF	GA
(Netherlands) West Stars	6	3	2	0	1	11	7
(Russia) MFK Dinamo Moskva	6	3	2	0	1	14	7
(Slovenia) Svea Lesna Litija	3	3	1	0	2	12	14
(Kazakhstan) MFC Zhigitter Astana	3	3	1	0	2	3	18

Dinamo	0–3 (t)	West Stars
Litija	6–4	Astana
Dinamo	11–2	Astana
West Stars	7–4	Litija
Astana	3–1	West Stars
Litjia	2–3	Dinamo

=== Group 8 ===
Team	Pts	Pld	W	D	L	GF	GA
(Portugal) Benfica	9	3	3	0	0	27	2
(Serbia and Montenegro) CD Shop Mozart Danilovgrad	4	3	1	1	1	16	14
(Greece) Athina 90	4	3	1	1	1	9	17
(Bosnia and Herzegovina) Kaskada Gračanica	0	3	0	0	3	11	30

Danilovgrad	2–2	Athina
Benfica	11–0	Gračanica
Gračanica	8–12	Danilovgrad
Benfica	12–0	Athina
Athina	7–3	Gračanica
Danilovgrad	2–4	Benfica

== Second qualifying round ==
=== Group A ===
Team	Pts	Pld	W	D	L	GF	GA
(Spain) Boomerang Interviú	7	3	2	1	0	17	6
(Spain) Playas de Castellon	5	3	1	2	0	24	7
(Ukraine) InterKrAZ Kiev	4	3	1	1	1	16	12
(Netherlands) West Stars	0	3	0	0	3	2	34

Castellon	17–0	West Stars
Interviu	5–4	InterKrAZ
InterKrAZ	5–5	Castellon
Interviu	10–0	West Stars
West Stars	2–7	InterKrAZ
Castellon	2–2	Interviu

=== Group B ===
Team	Pts	Pld	W	D	L	GF	GA
(Portugal) Benfica	9	3	3	0	0	17	6
(Belgium) Action 21 Charleroi	6	3	2	0	1	15	6
(Italy) Prato Calcio a 5	3	3	1	0	2	5	11
(Croatia) MNK Split	0	3	0	0	3	1	15

Split	0–6	Charleroi
Prato	2–5	Benfica
Charleroi	5–1	Prato
Split	0–7	Benfica
Prato	2–1	Split
Benfica	5–4	Charleroi

== Final ==
The 2004 UEFA Futsal Cup Final was played on 24 April 2004 at the Pabellón Parque Corredor in Torrejón de Ardoz, Spain, and on 1 May 2004 at the Pavilhão da Luz Nº 1 in Lisbon, Portugal. Interviú won 7–5 on aggregate.

24 April 2004	(Spain) Boomerang Interviú	4–1	(Portugal) Benfica	Pabellón Parque Corredor, Torrejón
	Marquinho 1'; Daniel 2', 4'; Andreu 34'		Arnaldo 40'	Attendance: 2000

1 May 2004	(Portugal) Benfica	4–3	(Spain) Interviú	Pavilhão da Luz Nº 1, Lisbon
	Rogério Vilela 7'; André Lima 25', 33', 34'		Daniel 2', 35'; Marquinho 17'	Attendance: 2500

UEFA Futsal Cup
2003–04 Winners

Interviú
1st Title
