= Belarusian Futsal Premier League =

- Founded: 1990
- Country: Belarus
- Confederation: UEFA
- Number of clubs: 16
- Level on pyramid: 1
- Domestic cup: Belarusian Futsal Cup
- International cup: UEFA Futsal Cup
- Current champions: Stalitsa (Minsk)
- Most championships: Darozhnik (Minsk) (6)
- Website: mini-football.by
- Current: Current Season at UEFA.com

Premier League is the premier professional futsal league in Belarus. It was founded in 1990. Organized by Football Federation of Belarus and is played under UEFA rules, consists of 16 teams.

== List of champions ==
| Season | Champions | 2nd place | 3rd place |
|---|---|---|---|
| 1990 | Pahonia-Miensk (Minsk) | Ekanamist (Minsk) | SKIF (Minsk) |
| 1991 | Miensk (Minsk) | Khimik (Homieĺ) | Miensk-2 (Minsk) |
| 1992 | Atlant (Minsk) | Santana-Khimik (Homieĺ) | Miensk (Minsk) |
| 1992-93 | Budzakaz (Minsk) | Miensk (Minsk) | Atlant (Minsk) |
| 1993-94 | Miensk (Minsk) | Budzakaz (Minsk) | Sielmash-Ellada (Mahilioŭ) |
| 1994-95 | Transmash-Ellada (Mahilioŭ) | Elita-Talan (Minsk) | Budzakaz (Minsk) |
| 1995-96 | CKK (Śvietlahorsk) | Budzakaz (Minsk) | Transmash (Mahilioŭ) |
| 1996-97 | Akademiya (Minsk) | CKK (Śvietlahorsk) | Vieras (Niasviž Region) |
| 1997-98 | Vieras (Niasviž Region) | VA-BDU (Minsk) | CKK (Śvietlahorsk) |
| 1998-99 | Darozhnik (Fanipaĺ) | RANN-BDPA (Minsk) | CKK (Śvietlahorsk) |
| 1999-00 | Simurh (Minsk) | Darozhnik (Fanipaĺ) | Mietalurh (Molodechno) |
| 2000-01 | Simurh (Minsk) | Belaŭtaservis (Navapolack) | Mietalurh-JP (Molodechno) |
| 2001-02 | Darozhnik (Fanipaĺ) | Belaŭtaservis (Navapolack) | Simurh (Minsk) |
| 2002-03 | Darozhnik (Fanipaĺ) | Belaŭtaservis (Navapolack) | Belahraprambank (Minsk) |
| 2003-04 | Darozhnik (Minsk) | Belahraprambank (Minsk) | Belaŭtaservis (Viciebsk) |
| 2004-05 | Darozhnik (Minsk) | MAPID (Minsk) | Belahraprambank (Minsk) |
| 2005-06 | Darozhnik (Minsk) | Viciebskenerha (Orša) | MAPID (Minsk) |
| 2006-07 | MAPID (Minsk) | Viciebskenerha (Orša) | Darozhnik (Minsk) |
| 2007-08 | VitEn (Novalukomĺ) | MAPID (Minsk) | Darozhnik (Minsk) |
| 2008-09 | VitEn (Novalukomĺ) | MAPID (Minsk) | Darozhnik (Minsk) |
| 2009-10 | MAPID (Minsk) | Darozhnik (Minsk) | VitEn (Orša) |
| 2010-11 | MAPID (Minsk) | BČ (Homieĺ) | VitEn (Orša) |
| 2011-12 | Lidsieľmash (Lida) | MAPID (Minsk) | BČ (Homieĺ) |
| 2012-13 | Viten (Viciebsk) | MAPID (Minsk) | Lidsieľmash (Lida) |
| 2013-14 | Stalitsa (Minsk) | Viten (Viciebsk) | MAPID (Minsk) |
| 2014-15 | Lidsieľmash (Lida) | Viten (Viciebsk) | Stalitsa (Minsk) |
| 2015-16 | Lidsieľmash (Lida) | MAPID (Minsk) | Stalitsa (Minsk) |
| 2016-17 | Stalitsa (Minsk) | VRZ (Homieĺ) | Lidsieľmash (Lida) |

== Teams 2017-18 ==
- Achova-Dynama (Minsk)
- AK Paŭdniovy (Homieĺ Region)
- Amatar (Brest)
- Barysaŭ-900 (Barysaŭ)
- BČ (Homieĺ)
- Darozhnik (Minsk)
- Dynama-BNTU (Minsk)
- Forte (Mahilioŭ)
- Hranit (Mikaševičy)
- Lidsieľmash (Lida)
- Stalitsa (Minsk)
- Śvietlahorsk (Śvietlahorsk)
- Ščučyn (Ščučyn)
- UUS-Dynama (Hrodna)
- Viten (Orša)
- VRZ (Homieĺ)
