= Time Lviv =

- Full name: FC Time Lviv
- Founded: 2000
- Dissolved: 2011
- Ground: Lviv, Ukraine
- Capacity: unknown
- Manager: (Ukraine) Stanyslav Goncharenko
- League: Ukrainian Futsal Championship
- 2008-09: Premiere League, 1st
Home colours	Away colours

FC Time Lviv (Футзальний клуб "Тайм") was a futsal team from Lviv, Ukraine, which played in the Ukrainian Futsal Championship.

In the middle of the 2010–2011 season the team ceased to exist due to financial problems.

== Honours ==
=== Domestic ===
- Ukrainian Extra-Liga:

(gold) Winners (2): 2008/09, 2009/10

- Ukrainian Futsal Cup:

(gold) Winners (1): 2009/10

- Ukrainian Futsal Super Cup:

(gold) Winners (1): 2009

== FC Time Lviv in European football ==
As of match played November 2010

Season	Round	Opponent	Score	Result
2009–10	Main round Debrecen, Hungary	(Hungary) MVFC Berettyóújfalu	6–0	W
2009–10	Main round Debrecen, Hungary	(Italy) Luparense	3–3	D
2009–10	Main round Debrecen, Hungary	(Moldova) Tornado Chișinău	11–1	W
2009–10	Elite round Pardubice, Czech Republic	(Czech Republic) Era-Pack Chrudim	4–2	W
2009–10	Elite round Pardubice, Czech Republic	(Spain) Interviú	1–3	L
2009–10	Elite round Pardubice, Czech Republic	(Slovenia) KMN Puntar	5–0	W
2010–11	Main round Lviv, Ukraine	(Cyprus) Ararat Nicosia	5–1	W
2010–11	Main round Lviv, Ukraine	(Bosnia and Herzegovina) Orlić Sarajevo	2–1	W
2010–11	Main round Lviv, Ukraine	(Greece) Athina 90	9–3	W
2010–11	Elite round Kragujevac, Serbia	(Serbia) Ekonomac Kragujevac	1–7	L
2010–11	Elite round Kragujevac, Serbia	(Portugal) Benfica	1–2	L
2010–11	Elite round Kragujevac, Serbia	(Croatia) Nacional Zagreb	4–1	W

=== Summary ===
Season	Pld	W	D	L	GF	GA	Last round
2009–10	6	4	1	1	30	9	Elite round
2010–11	6	4	0	2	22	15	Elite round
Total	12	8	1	3	52	24	
