= MFC Interkas Kyiv =

Interkas Kyiv
- Full name: MFC Interkas Kyiv
- Founded: 1993
- Dissolved: 2007
- Ground: Palace of Sports, Kyiv, Ukraine
- League: Futsal Championship
Home colours	Away colours

MFC Interkas Kyiv (ukr. Міні-Футбольний Клуб «Інтеркас» Київ), is a futsal club from Kyiv, Ukraine, and plays in Ukrainian Men's Futsal Championship.

The club is one of the most titled clubs in Ukraine.

== Honours ==
=== Domestic ===
- Ukrainian Extra-Liga:

(gold) Winners (3): 1998/99, 1999/2000, 2002/03
(silver) Runners-up (6): 1996/97, 1997/98, 2000/01, 2001/02, 2004/05, 2006/07
(bronze) Third place (1): 2005/06

- Ukrainian Futsal Cup:

(gold) Winners (3): 1999/2000, 2000/01, 2004/05
(silver) Runners-up (2): 1997/98, 2001/02

- Ukrainian Futsal Super Cup:

(silver) Runners-up (1): 2005

== MFC Interkas Kyiv in European football ==
As of season 2003–04

Season	Round	Opponent	Score	Result
2001–02	Qualifying round Budapest, Hungary	(Hungary) Üllő FC Cső-Montage	2–2	D
2001–02	Qualifying round Budapest, Hungary	(Latvia) FK Policijas	9–1	W
2003–04	Qualifying round Skopje, North Macedonia	(North Macedonia) KMF Skopje	3–0	W
2003–04	Qualifying round Skopje, North Macedonia	(Andorra) UE Santa Coloma	16–1	W
2003–04	Qualifying round Skopje, North Macedonia	(Czech Republic) Nejzbach Vysoké Mýto	3–0	W
2003–04	Main round Torrejón de Ardoz, Spain	(Spain) Boomerang Interviú	4–5	L
2003–04	Main round Torrejón de Ardoz, Spain	(Spain) Playas de Castellón	5–5	D
2003–04	Main round Torrejón de Ardoz, Spain	(Netherlands) West Stars	7–2	W

=== Summary ===
Season	Pld	W	D	L	GF	GA	Last round
2001–02	2	1	1	0	11	3	Qualifying round
2003–04	6	4	1	1	38	13	Main round
Total	8	5	2	1	49	16	
