= MFC Stalitsa Minsk =

Stalitsa Minsk
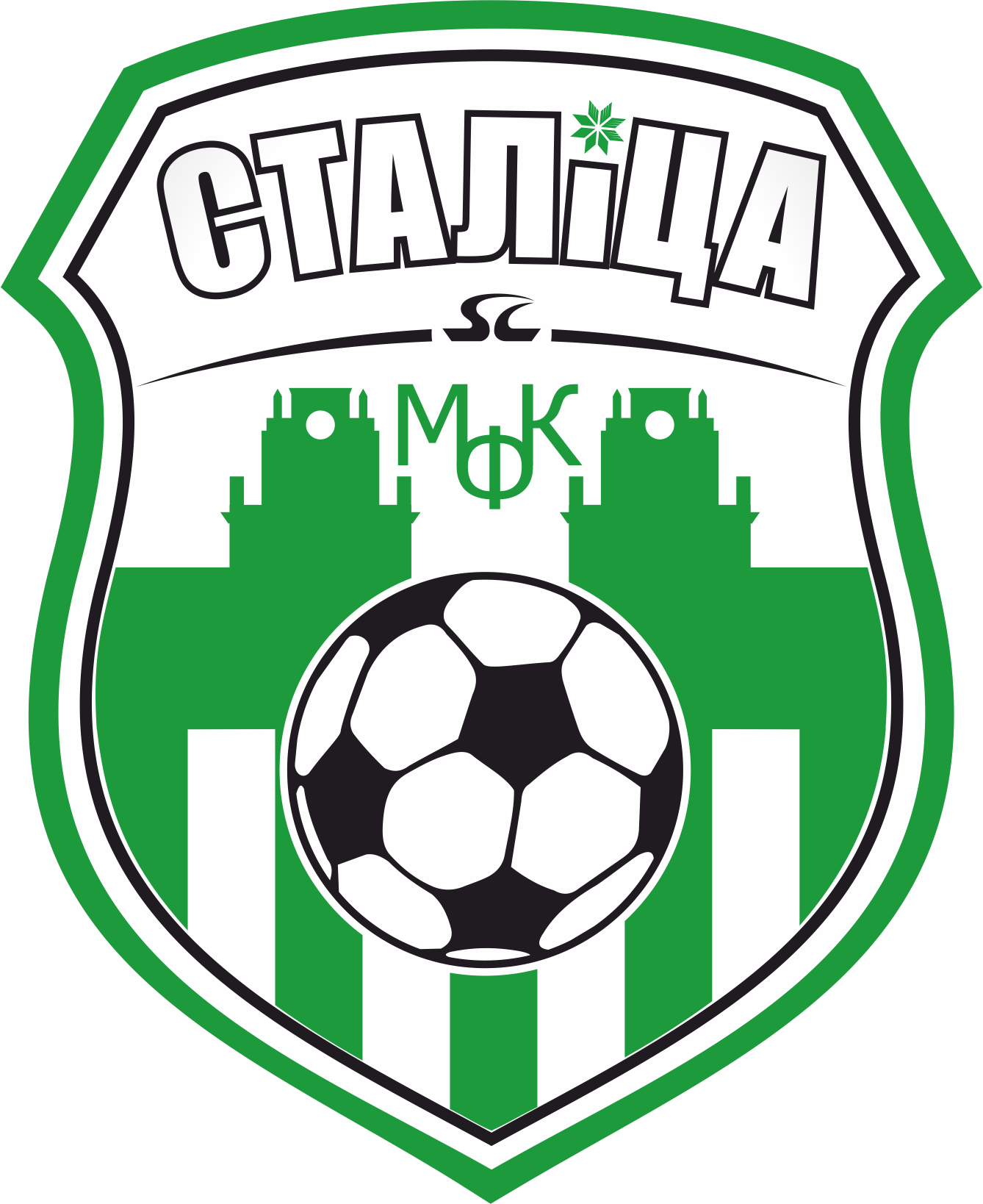
- Full name: МФК «Сталіца» Мінск
- Short name: «Сталіца»
- Founded: 2013
- Ground: «Uručča» Sport palace
- Capacity: 3000
- Chairman: Aliaksiej Achramovič
- Coach: (Belarus) Aleksandr Chibisov
- League: Belarusian Futsal Premier League
- 2023–24: Regular season: 3rd of 12; Playoffs: Champions
- Website: http://www.fc-stalitsa.by/

MFC Stalitsa Minsk (Belarusian: МФК «Сталіца» Мінск) is a Belarusan futsal club from Minsk, that plays in the Belarus national futsal championships, founded in 2013. Six-time champions of Belarus and Belarusan cup winner (2014/15).

== Honours ==
=== Domestic ===
==== League ====
- Belarusian Premier League
  - Winners (6): 2013/14, 2016/17, 2018/19, 2021/22, 2022/23, 2023/24

==== Cup ====
- Belarusian Cup
  - Winners (1): 2014/15

== Current squad ==
As of 3 November 2024

#	Position	Name	Nationality
1	Goalkeeper	Maxim Trofimovich	(Belarus)
12	Goalkeeper	Aleksei Luksha	(Belarus)
35	Goalkeeper	Nikita Kirdey	(Belarus)
7	Defender	Daniil Astafyev	(Belarus)
10	Defender	Aliaksandr Umpirovich	(Belarus)
21	Defender	Igor Scherbich	(Belarus)
27	Defender	Sergei Lavor	(Belarus)
4	Winger	Oleh Yeromin	(Ukraine)
11	Winger	Vladimir Piskun	(Belarus)
16	Winger	Artem Kozel	(Belarus)
17	Winger	Shokhrukh Makhmadaminov	(Kyrgyzstan)
33	Winger	Maxim Ampleev	(Belarus)
44	Winger	Artem Romanchik	(Belarus)
70	Winger	Sebastián Figueroa	(Chile)
14	Pivot	Oleg Gorbenko	(Belarus)
20	Pivot	Ilnur Islamov	(Russia)
26	Pivot	Artem Yakubov	(Belarus)
