= Uragan Ivano-Frankivsk =

- Full name: People's Football Club Urahan Ivano-Frankivsk
- Founded: 2002
- Ground: Sport Complex College of Physical Education, Ivano-Frankivsk, Ukraine
- Capacity: 600
- Chairman: (Ukraine) Oleksandr Buben
- Manager: (Ukraine) Serhiy Hupalenko
- League: Extra-Liga
- Website: uragan.if.ua
Home colours	Away colours

Uragan Ivano-Frankivsk (People Football Club "Uragan" Ivano-Frankivsk, Ukrainian: Народний Футбольний Клуб «Ураган» Івано-Франківськ), is a futsal team from Ivano-Frankivsk, Ukraine.

The team was founded in 2002, and after two years was promoted from the second league to the first.

== Honors ==
=== Domestic ===
- Ukrainian Championship:

(gold) Winners (2): 2010/11, 2020/21
(silver) Runners-up (3): 2012/13, 2018/18, 2022/23
(bronze) Third place (4): 2011/12, 2013/14, 2019/20, 2023/24

- Ukrainian Cup:

(gold) Winners (4): 2018/19, 2019/20, 2023/24, 2024/25
(silver) Runners-up (1): 2017/18

== UEFA Futsal Cup / Champions League matches ==
As of match played November 2022

Season	Round	Opponent	Score	Result
2011–12	Main round Kragujevac, Serbia	(Cyprus) Omonia	6–4	W
2011–12	Main round Kragujevac, Serbia	(Israel) ASA Ben Gurion	6–4	W
2011–12	Main round Kragujevac, Serbia	(Serbia) Ekonomac Kragujevac	3–5	L
2011–12	Elite round Padova, Italy	(Italy) Montesilvano	1–1	D
2011–12	Elite round Padova, Italy	(Italy) Marca Futsal	2–4	L
2011–12	Elite round Padova, Italy	(Slovakia) Slov-Matic Bratislava	4–3	W
2021–22	Main round Ivano-Frankivsk, Ukraine	(Azerbaijan) Araz Naxçıvan	2–1	W
2021–22	Main round Ivano-Frankivsk, Ukraine	(Kosovo) Liqeni	7–1	W
2021–22	Main round Ivano-Frankivsk, Ukraine	(Romania) United Galați	2–0	W
2021–22	Elite round Lisbon, Portugal	(Spain) Levante	5–3	W
2021–22	Elite round Lisbon, Portugal	(Portugal) Benfica	0–4	L
2021–22	Elite round Lisbon, Portugal	(Hungary) Haladás	0–4	L
2022–23	Main round Galați, Romania	(Romania) United Galați	5–0	W
2022–23	Main round Galați, Romania	(Portugal) Benfica	1–4	L
2022–23	Main round Galați, Romania	(Hungary) Haladás	4–4	D
2022–23	Elite round Aversa, Italy	(Italy) Feldi Eboli	7–4	W
2022–23	Elite round Aversa, Italy	(Portugal) Sporting CP	2–4	L
2022–23	Elite round Aversa, Italy	(Serbia) Loznica-Grad	2–1	W

Note: In the 2022–23 UEFA Futsal Champions League, Uragan replaced Prodexim Kherson, who were withdrawn by UEFA due to the Russian occupation of Kherson.

=== Summary ===
Season	Competition	Pld	W	D	L	GF	GA	Last round
2011–12	UEFA Futsal Cup	6	3	1	2	22	21	Elite round
2021–22	UEFA Futsal Champions League	6	4	0	2	16	13	Elite round
2022–23	UEFA Futsal Champions League	6	3	1	2	21	17	Elite round
Total		18	10	2	6	59	51	
