= Red Devils Chojnice =

Polish futsal club

- Full name: Red Devils Futsal Club Chojnice
- Nickname(s): Czerwone Diabły
- Founded: 1995; 30 years ago
- Ground: OSiR Chojnice
- Chairman: Tomasz Mrozek Gliszczyński
- Manager: Oleg Zozulya
- League: I liga North
- 2024–25: Ekstraklasa, 15th of 16 (relegated)
- Website: https://www.rdfc.pl

Red Devils Chojnice is a Polish futsal club located in Chojnice. The club competes in the I liga North, the second tier of Polish futsal. The team's colors are red and white.

== Current squad ==
As of 4 February 2025

Note: Flags indicate national team as defined under FIFA eligibility rules; some limited exceptions apply. Players may hold more than one non-FIFA nationality.

No.	Pos.	Nation	Player
1	Goalkeeper	(Poland) POL	Artur Czarnowski
2	Defender	(Latvia) LVA	Jānis Pastars
3	Winger	(Poland) POL	Joachim Kowalski
9	Pivot	(Brazil) BRA	Fabio Torres
10	Winger	(Brazil) BRA	Franklin Neto
14	Winger	(Poland) POL	Patryk Laskowski
15	Defender	(Ukraine) UKR	Vitaliy Kolesnik
16	Winger	(Colombia) COL	Jefferson Rocha
17	Pivot	(Georgia (country)) GEO	Guladi Kokoladze
20	Winger	(Ukraine) UKR	Vladyslav Tkachenko
22	Winger	(Ukraine) UKR	Andrii Yelishev
23	Defender	(Ukraine) UKR	Pavlo Skubchenko
24	Goalkeeper	(Poland) POL	Kacper Trzebiński
25	Winger	(Poland) POL	Wojciech Włodarczyk
55	Winger	(Poland) POL	Piotr Kręcki
77	Goalkeeper	(Ukraine) UKR	Pavlo Puchka
80	Winger	(Portugal) POR	David Rodrigues
83	Goalkeeper	(Poland) POL	Sebastian Kartuszyński
88	Winger	(Brazil) BRA	Giovanni Paesano

== Honours ==
- I liga
  - Champions: 2007–08 (group I), 2017–18 (North), 2023–24 (North)
- II liga, group II
  - Champions: 2006–07
- Polish Cup
  - Winners: 2015–16
- Polish Super Cup
  - Runners-up: 2016
