= 2025–26 UEFA Futsal Champions League =

40th edition of top European men's futsal competition

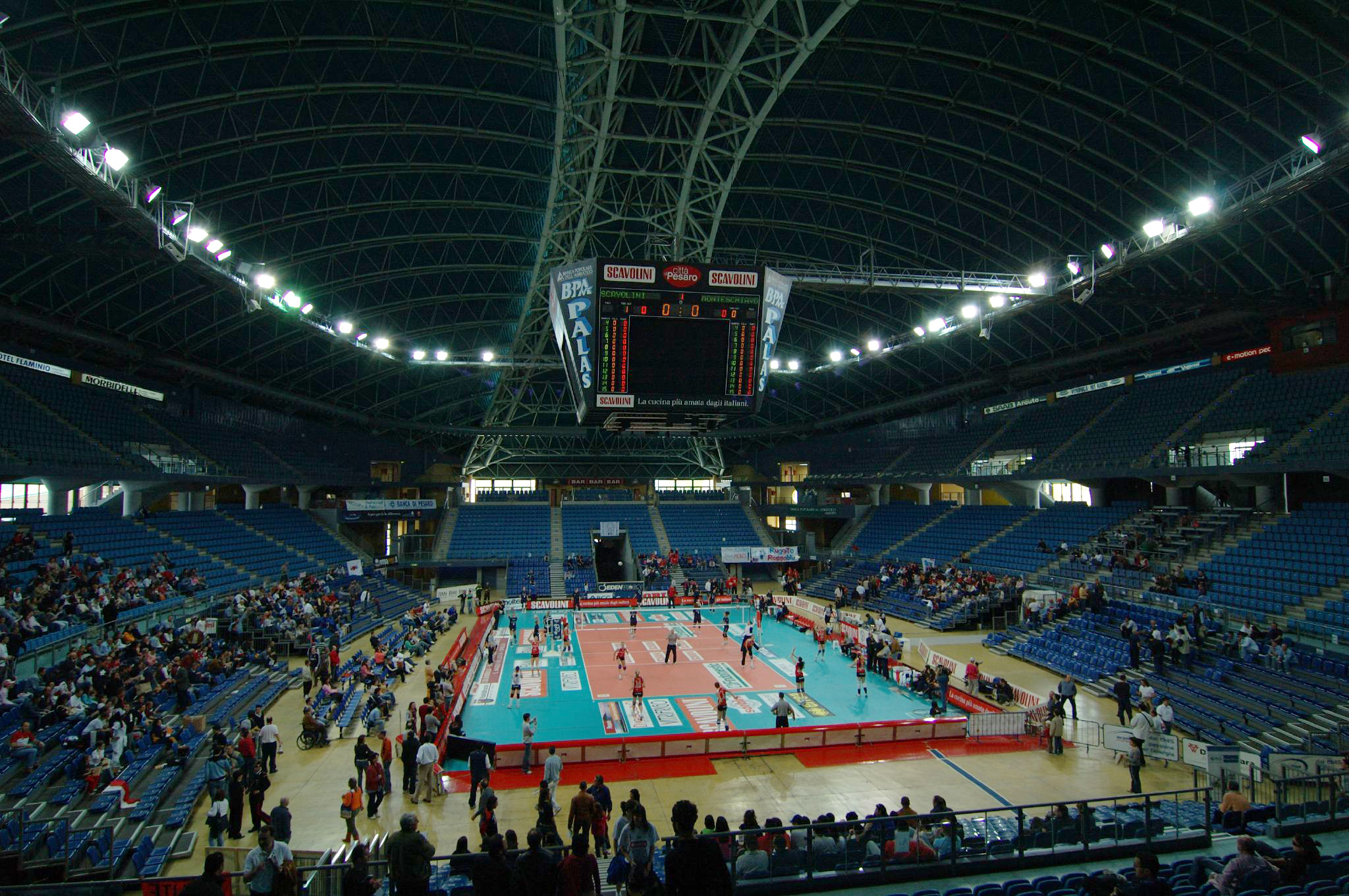
- Vitrifrigo Arena in Pesaro hosted the finals

Tournament details
- Dates: Qualifying rounds: 26 August 2025 – 5 December 2025; Final tournament: 7–10 May 2026
- Teams: Final tournament: 4 Total: 56 (from 52 associations)

Final positions
- Champions: (Portugal) Sporting CP (3rd title)
- Runners-up: (Spain) Palma Futsal
- Third place: (Spain) Jimbee Cartagena
- Fourth place: (France) Étoile Lavalloise

Tournament statistics
- Matches played: 124
- Top scorer(s): Soufian Charraoui (Tigers Roermond) (11 goals)

The 2025–26 UEFA Futsal Champions League was the 40th edition of Europe's premier club futsal tournament, and the 25th edition organized by UEFA. It was also the eighth edition since the tournament was rebranded from "UEFA Futsal Cup" to UEFA Futsal Champions League.

Palma Futsal were the title holders.

== Association team allocation ==
A total of 56 teams from 52 of the 55 UEFA member associations participated in the 2025–26 UEFA Futsal Champions League. The association ranking based on the UEFA futsal national team coefficients was used to determine the number of participating teams for each association:

- The top three-ranked associations have two teams qualify.
- The winners of the 2024–25 UEFA Futsal Champions League qualify automatically and its association can also enter a second team. If the title-holders' association is among the top three-ranked associations, the 4th ranked association is also entitled to enter a second team.
- The remaining associations have one team qualify.

For this season, the top three-ranked associations are Portugal, Spain, and Kazakhstan. As the title holders are from Spain, the 4th ranked association, Ukraine, can also enter two teams, after UEFA's decision to exclude Russian clubs from all UEFA competitions due to the 2022 Russian invasion of Ukraine.

=== Distribution ===
For the 2024–25 UEFA Futsal Champions League, the clubs' entry round was determined by their UEFA futsal club coefficients, which took into account their performance from the previous three seasons.

Access list for 2024–25 UEFA Futsal Champions League
| | | Teams entering in this round | Teams advancing from previous round |
|---|---|---|---|
| Preliminary round (32 teams) | | 32 teams ranked 24–55 | |
| Main round | Path A (16 teams) | Title holders; 15 teams ranked 1–11 and 16–19 | |
| Main round | Path B (16 teams) | 8 teams ranked 12–15 and 20–23 | 8 group winners from preliminary round |
| Elite round (16 teams) | | | 4 group winners from main round path A; 4 group runners-up from main round path A; 4 group third-placed teams from main round path A; 4 group winners from main round path B |
| Final tournament (4 teams) | | | 4 Quarter-final winners from elite round |

=== Teams ===
Below are the participating teams of the 2025–26 UEFA Futsal Champions League (with their ranking among participating teams), grouped by their starting round and path for the main round.

Main round Path A
| Team | Rank |
|---|---|
| (Spain) Palma Futsal | TH |
| (Portugal) Sporting CP | 1 |
| (Portugal) SL Benfica | 2 |
| (Spain) Jimbee Cartagena | 3 |
| (Kazakhstan) Kairat | 4 |
| (Belgium) Anderlecht | 5 |
| (Kazakhstan) Futsal Club Semey | 6 |
| (Latvia) Riga Futsal Club | 7 |
| (France) Étoile Lavalloise | 8 |
| (Serbia) KMF Loznica | 9 |
| (Croatia) Vrijeme Makarska | 10 |
| (Poland) Piast Gliwice | 11 |
| (Malta) Luxol St Andrews | 16 |
| (Lithuania) Kauno Žalgiris | 17 |
| (Czech Republic) MFK Chrudim | 18 |
| (Kosovo) FC Prishtina 01 | 19 |

Main round Path B
| Team | Rank |
|---|---|
| (Italy) Meta Catania C5 | 12 |
| (Romania) Clubul Sportiv United Galați | 13 |
| (Slovakia) MIMEL Lučenec | 14 |
| (Ukraine) HIT Kyiv | 15 |
| (Luxembourg) Differdange 03 | 20 |
| (Switzerland) Futsal Minerva | 21 |
| (Ukraine) Kyiv Futsal | 22 |
| (Finland) Akaa Futsal | 23 |

Preliminary round
| Team | Rank |
|---|---|
| (Slovenia) NK Vrhnika | 24 |
| (Azerbaijan) Araz Naxçivan | 25 |
| (Netherlands) Tigers Roermond | 26 |
| (Belarus) Viten Orsha | 27 |
| (Armenia) Yerevan FC | 28 |
| (Hungary) 1. Futsal Club Veszprém | 29 |
| (Bosnia and Herzegovina) MNK Buba Mara | 30 |
| (Denmark) Hjørring Futsal Klub | 31 |
| (North Macedonia) Futsal Club Forca | 32 |
| (Greece) AEK Futsal | 33 |
| (Cyprus) AEL Limassol Futsal | 34 |
| (Sweden) Borås AIK | 35 |
| (Republic of Ireland) Blue Magic Dublin | 36 |
| (Montenegro) Bajo Pivljanin | 37 |
| (Austria) FC Ljuti Krajisnici | 38 |
| (Germany) TSV Weilimdorf | 39 |
| (Georgia (country)) MFC CIU | 40 |
| (Bulgaria) PFC Levski Sofia | 41 |
| (Estonia) FC Tallinn B.P. | 42 |
| (Moldova) Clic Chișinău | 43 |
| (Albania) KF Vllaznia Shkodër | 44 |
| (Scotland) PYF Saltires | 45 |
| (Norway) Sjarmtrollan | 46 |
| (Andorra) FC Encamp | 47 |
| (England) Bolton Futsal Club | 48 |
| (San Marino) SS Murata | 49 |
| (Wales) Futsal Club Cardiff | 50 |
| (Northern Ireland) Sparta Belfast | 51 |
| (Iceland) Ísbjörninn | 52 |
| (Gibraltar) Europa FC | 53 |
| (Israel) Maccabi Netanya Futsal | 54 |
| (Turkey) Vangölü FK | 55 |

== Format ==
The tournament has a mini-tournament format consisting of three qualifying rounds and the final tournament. The qualifying rounds consisted of the following stages:

- Preliminary round: 32 teams entering this round were divided into eight groups of four teams with the group winners advancing to the next round.
- Main round:
  - Path A: 16 teams entering this round were divided into four groups of four teams, with the group winners, runners-up, and third-placed teams advancing to the next round.
  - Path B: 8 teams that entered in this round and the 8 teams advancing from the preliminary round were divided into four groups of four teams, with the group winners advancing to the next round.
- Round of 16: 16 teams advancing from the main round were drawn into eight home-away matches with winners advancing to next round. Top two teams from each Path A group are seeded.
- Quarter-finals: Eight winners from previous round are drawn into four home-away matches with winners advancing to Final tournament.

The final tournament is played at a centralized location and consisted of single-legged semi-finals, a third-place play-off, and final. If scores were level at the end of normal time, extra time was played, followed by a penalty shoot-out if the scores remained tied.

=== Tiebreakers ===
Teams were ranked according to points (3 points for a win, 1 point for a draw, 0 points for a loss). If two or more teams were tied on points, the following tiebreaking criteria were applied, in the order given, to determine the rankings (see Article 14 Equality of points – mini-tournaments, Regulations of the UEFA Futsal Champions League):

1. Points in head-to-head matches among the tied teams;
2. Goal difference in head-to-head matches among the tied teams;
3. Goals scored in head-to-head matches among the tied teams;
4. If more than two teams were tied, and after applying all head-to-head criteria above, a subset of teams are still tied, all head-to-head criteria above were reapplied exclusively to this subset of teams;
5. Goal difference in all group matches;
6. Goals scored in all group matches;
7. Disciplinary points (direct red card = 3 points; double yellow card = 3 points; single yellow card = 1 point);
8. UEFA futsal club coefficients.

If two teams that have the same number of points and have scored and conceded the same number of goals play their last mini-tournament match against each other and are still equal at the end of that match, their final rankings are determined by a penalty shoot-out provided that no other teams within the group have the same number of points on completion of the mini-tournament. This procedure is only necessary if a ranking of the teams is required to determine the team which qualifies for the next stage.

== Schedule ==
The schedule of the competition was as follows (all draws were held at the UEFA headquarters in Nyon, Switzerland).

Schedule for 2025–26 UEFA Futsal Champions League
| Phase | Round | Draw | Dates |
|---|---|---|---|
| Qualifying stage | Preliminary round | 3 July 2025 | 26–31 August 2025 |
| Final tournament | Main round | 3 July 2025 | 28 October – 2 November 2025 |
| Final tournament | Round of 16 | 6 November 2025 | 24 November 2025 (first leg); 5 December 2025 (second leg) |
| Final tournament | Quarter-finals | 6 November 2025 | 23 February 2026 (first leg); 6 March 2026 (second leg) |
| Final tournament | Semi-finals | 6 November 2025 | 8 May 2026 |
| Final tournament | Final | 10 May 2026 | |

== Preliminary round ==
The draw for the preliminary round was held on 3 July 2025, 14:00 CET. The preliminary round was played from 26 to 31 August 2025. The winners of each group progressed to the main round Path B.

Times are CEST, as listed by UEFA (local times, if different, are in parentheses).

=== Seeding ===
A total of 32 teams played in the preliminary round. Seeding of teams was based on their 2024 UEFA futsal club coefficients. Eight teams were pre-selected as hosts and were first drawn from a separate pot to their corresponding seeding position. The remaining teams were then drawn from their respective pots to their corresponding seeding position. Teams from Armenia & Azerbaijan could not be drawn into the same group.

| Seeding position 1 | Seeding position 2 | Seeding position 3 | Seeding position 4 |
|---|---|---|---|
| (Slovenia) NK Vrhnika; (Azerbaijan) Araz Naxçivan; (Netherlands) Tigers Roermond; (Belarus) Viten Orsha; (Armenia) Yerevan FC; (Hungary) 1. Futsal Club Veszprém; (Bosnia and Herzegovina) MNK Buba Mara (H); (Denmark) Hjørring Futsal Klub | (North Macedonia) Futsal Club Forca (H); (Greece) AEK Futsal (H); (Cyprus) AEL Limassol Futsal; (Sweden) Borås AIK (H); (Republic of Ireland) Blue Magic Dublin; (Montenegro) Bajo Pivljanin; (Austria) FC Ljuti Krajisnici (H); (Germany) TSV Weilimdorf | (Georgia (country)) MFC CIU; (Bulgaria) PFC Levski Sofia (H); (Estonia) FC Tallinn B.P.; (Moldova) Clic Chișinău (H); (Albania) KF Vllaznia Shkodër (H); (Scotland) PYF Saltires; (Norway) Sjarmtrollan; (Andorra) FC Encamp | (England) Bolton Futsal Club; (San Marino) SS Murata; (Wales) Futsal Club Cardiff; (Northern Ireland) Sparta Belfast; (Iceland) Ísbjörninn; (Gibraltar) Europa FC; (Israel) Maccabi Netanya Futsal; (Turkey) Vangölü FK |

Notes

- H – Mini-tournament hosts

=== Group A ===
| Pos | Team | Pld | W | D | L | GF | GA | GD | Pts | Qualification |
|---|---|---|---|---|---|---|---|---|---|---|
| 1 | (North Macedonia) FORCA (H) | 3 | 3 | 0 | 0 | 10 | 0 | +10 | 9 | Advance to main round |
| 2 | (San Marino) Murata | 3 | 2 | 0 | 1 | 9 | 4 | +5 | 6 | |
| 3 | (Armenia) Yerevan | 3 | 1 | 0 | 2 | 4 | 10 | −6 | 3 | |
| 4 | (Andorra) Encamp | 3 | 0 | 0 | 3 | 4 | 13 | −9 | 0 | |

Source: UEFA
Rules for classification: Tiebreakers
(H) Hosts
27 August 2025
17:30

| Yerevan (Armenia) | 1–3 | (San Marino) Murata |
|---|---|---|
| Khatuev 17'05" | Report | Jamičić 10'52", 25'30", 36'55" |

Sportska Sala, Kumanovo
Attendance: 45
Referee: George Jansizian (Sweden), Sven Schreiber (Germany)
27 August 2025
20:30

| Encamp (Andorra) | 0–4 | (North Macedonia) FORCA |
|---|---|---|
| | Report | Ramadani 12'21"; Linares Moreno 30'23"; Ramadan 33'50", 39'06" |

Sportska Sala, Kumanovo
Attendance: 325
Referee: Bryan Claude François (France), Paweł Tokarewicz (Poland)

28 August 2025
17:30

| Encamp (Andorra) | 2–3 | (Armenia) Yerevan |
|---|---|---|
| Clemente 22'47", 37'59" | Report | Khatuev 5'45"; Muradyan 18'07"; Yeghiazaryan 27'15" |

Sportska Sala, Kumanovo
Attendance: 30
Referee: Paweł Tokarewicz (Poland), George Jansizian (Sweden)
28 August 2025
20:30

| FORCA (North Macedonia) | 1–0 | (San Marino) Murata |
|---|---|---|
| Seferi 20'37" | Report |

Sportska Sala, Kumanovo
Attendance: 300
Referee: Sven Schreiber (Germany), Bryan Claude François (France)

30 August 2025
17:30

| Murata (San Marino) | 6–2 | (Andorra) Encamp |
|---|---|---|
| Busignani 0'47", 18'05"; Ercolani 3'35"; Jamičić 13'43"; Moretti 21'05"; Protti 38'31" | Report | Ferreira 23'02"; Clemente 28'19" |

Sportska Sala, Kumanovo
Attendance: 50
Referee: Bryan Claude François (France), Paweł Tokarewicz (Poland)
30 August 2025
20:30

| FORCA (North Macedonia) | 5–0 | (Armenia) Yerevan |
|---|---|---|
| Ismaili 3'21"; Ramadan 16'43" (pen.); Muradyan 27'30" (o.g.); Leveski 38'42"; Ramadani 39'03" | Report |

Sportska Sala, Kumanovo
Attendance: 650
Referee: Sven Schreiber (Germany), George Jansizian (Sweden)

=== Group B ===
| Pos | Team | Pld | W | D | L | GF | GA | GD | Pts | Qualification |
|---|---|---|---|---|---|---|---|---|---|---|
| 1 | (Netherlands) Tigers Roermond | 3 | 3 | 0 | 0 | 23 | 4 | +19 | 9 | Advance to main round |
| 2 | (Montenegro) Bajo Pivljanin | 3 | 2 | 0 | 1 | 14 | 14 | 0 | 6 | |
| 3 | (Albania) Vllaznia (H) | 3 | 1 | 0 | 2 | 8 | 10 | −2 | 3 | |
| 4 | (Iceland) Ísbjörninn | 3 | 0 | 0 | 3 | 9 | 26 | −17 | 0 | |

Source: UEFA
Rules for classification: Tiebreakers
(H) Hosts
27 August 2025
16:00

| Tigers Roermond (Netherlands) | 12–2 | (Iceland) Ísbjörninn |
|---|---|---|
| Charraoui 0'55", 7'14", 9'12", 16'50", 27'49", 28'01"; Boukhari 16'24", 20'28"; Chadli 19'46"; Meyers 19'58"; Bouyouzan 22'12"; Džurlić 32'40" | Report | Baran 11'43"; Unai Fernández 31'06" |

Tirana Olympic Park, Tirana
Attendance: 50
Referee: Lukáš Peško (Slovakia), Nikola Tadić (Bosnia and Herzegovina)
27 August 2025
20:00

| Bajo Pivljanin (Montenegro) | 4–2 | (Albania) Vllaznia |
|---|---|---|
| Durutović 11'41"; Vuković 29'02", 29'41"; Davidović 36'30" | Report | Tafili 13'30"; Djepaxhia 13'37" |

Tirana Olympic Park, Tirana
Attendance: 80
Referee: Amine El Hilali (Belgium), Andrea Naudi (Malta)

28 August 2025
16:00

| Vllaznia (Albania) | 4–0 | (Iceland) Ísbjörninn |
|---|---|---|
| Tafić 6'17"; Gokaj 12'44"; Lolović 21'58"; Mustafaj 27'56" | Report |

Tirana Olympic Park, Tirana
Attendance: 30
Referee: Andrea Naudi (Malta), Lukáš Peško (Slovakia)
28 August 2025
20:00

| Bajo Pivljanin (Montenegro) | 0–5 | (Netherlands) Tigers Roermond |
|---|---|---|
| | Report | Chadli 14'19"; Belhaj 14'52"; M'Rabet-Eloued 17'40"; Boukhari 23'27"; Bouyouzan 34'27" |

Tirana Olympic Park, Tirana
Attendance: 60
Referee: Nikola Tadić (Bosnia and Herzegovina), Amine El Hilali (Belgium)

30 August 2025
16:00

| Ísbjörninn (Iceland) | 7–10 | (Montenegro) Bajo Pivljanin |
|---|---|---|
| Unai Fernandez 15'06", 24'05"; Olguín 17'02"; Ricardo Dias 23'01"; Lis 27'08"; Hafliðason 35'03"; Baran 38'58" | Report | Cimbaljević 5'02", 12'08", 25'07"; Ćalasan 5'49"; Ćalasan 14'51"; Marković 16'44"; Davidović 19'17", 33'56"; Durutović 21'30", 30'26" |

Tirana Olympic Park, Tirana
Attendance: 20
Referee: Nikola Tadić (Bosnia and Herzegovina), Lukáš Peško (Slovakia)
30 August 2025
20:00

| Vllaznia (Albania) | 2–6 | (Netherlands) Tigers Roermond |
|---|---|---|
| Lolović 33'55"; Gokaj 35'13" | Report | Boukhari 6'53"; Charraoui 13'59"; Mossaoui 19'20"; Bouyouzan 20'27", 21'35"; Džurlić 28'32" |

Tirana Olympic Park, Tirana
Attendance: 70
Referee: Andrea Naudi (Malta), Amine El Hilali (Belgium)

=== Group C ===
| Pos | Team | Pld | W | D | L | GF | GA | GD | Pts | Qualification |
|---|---|---|---|---|---|---|---|---|---|---|
| 1 | (Slovenia) Vrhnika | 3 | 3 | 0 | 0 | 35 | 7 | +28 | 9 | Advance to main round |
| 2 | (Sweden) Borås (H) | 3 | 1 | 1 | 1 | 33 | 13 | +20 | 4 | |
| 3 | (Estonia) Tallinn B.P. | 3 | 1 | 1 | 1 | 31 | 14 | +17 | 4 | |
| 4 | (Turkey) Vangölü | 3 | 0 | 0 | 3 | 19 | 84 | −65 | 0 | |

Source: UEFA
Rules for classification: Tiebreakers
(H) Hosts
27 August 2025
16:00

| Vrhnika (Slovenia) | 25–6 | (Turkey) Vangölü |
|---|---|---|
| Rems 0'17", 5'34", 13'57", 14'37", 20'29", 28'36", 39'11"; Debeljak 3'15", 17'05"; Trdin 5'18", 6'14"; Suban 7'53", 9'26", 18'20"; Ciuha 9'02", 34'09"; Frank 16'13", 33'15"; Novak 20'40", 36'20", 37'51", 38'09"; Zupančič 26'30", 33'47"; Tušar 37'17" | Report | Güleşçe 12'18", 25'17"; Süleyman Boztepe 23'14", 29'45", 35'25"; Hasan Ekmen 31'21" |

Boråshallen, Borås
Attendance: 60
Referee: Joern Te Kloeze (The Netherlands), Roosa-Maria Karoliina Tuomi (Finland)
27 August 2025
19:00

| Tallin B.P. (Estonia) | 2–2 | (Sweden) Borås |
|---|---|---|
| Ivanov 4'40"; Campos 18'31" | Report | Ed. Stüf 3'34" (o.g.); Cavalic 31'19" |

Boråshallen, Borås
Attendance: 1,249
Referee: Jordan Griffiths (England), Zyl Robert Fred Sheriff (Gibraltar)

28 August 2025
16:00

| Tallin B.P. (Estonia) | 0–5 | (Slovenia) Vrhnika |
|---|---|---|
| | Report | Tušar 9'21"; Trdin 15'30", 27'41"; Debeljak 24'41"; Frank 32'31" |

Boråshallen, Borås
Attendance: 60
Referee: Zyl Robert Fred Sheriff (Gibraltar), Joern Te Kloeze (The Netherlands)
28 August 2025
19:00

| Borås (Sweden) | 30–6 | (Turkey) Vangölü |
|---|---|---|
| El Horr 2'35", 7'00", 10'58", 13'57", 18'57", 22'41", 25'30"; Mahmuti 3'14", 20'46", 20'59"; Atai Najafi 4'19", 9'16", 28'51"; Ramadonovic 9'34", 14'57", 17'57", 21'59"; Raisi 10'42", 11'37", 16'39", 35'34", 36'05", 36'30"; Smajlovic 15'49", 25'16", 30'38", 39'44"; Najafi 29'32"; Bojang 37'32", 38'07" | Report | Süleyman Boztepe 3'28"; Tolan 12'27", 23'55"; Güleşçe 29'15"; Ipek 30'20"; Najafi 39'04" (o.g.) |

Boråshallen, Borås
Attendance: 539
Referee: Roosa-Maria Karoliina Tuomi (Finland), Jordan Griffiths (England)

30 August 2025
16:00

| Vangölü (Turkey) | 7–29 | (Estonia) Tallinn B.P. |
|---|---|---|
| Ipek 2'50", 28'33"; Hasan Ekmen 7'17", 19'59"; Basut 11'37", 17'33"; Naal 38'10" (o.g.) | Report | Vnukov 1'20", 37'33"; Ed. Stüf 4'41", 25'40"; Bõstrov 7'33", 35'54", 38'41"; Rojas Mendoza 8'30", 12'03", 12'14", 20'11"; Campos 16'31", 17'03", 29'55", 35'00"; Naal 17'48"; Ivanov 19'26", 24'21"; Keiber Quevedo 20'35", 26'18", 27'03", 30'19", 30'38", 31'55", 38'35", 39'30"; Tšernei 27'30", 33'07"; Tsvetkov 32'43" (pen.) |

Boråshallen, Borås
Attendance: 75
Referee: Zyl Robert Fred Sheriff (Gibraltar), Roosa-Maria Karoliina Tuomi (Finland)
30 August 2025
19:00

| Borås (Sweden) | 1–5 | (Slovenia) Vrhnika |
|---|---|---|
| Raisi 4'07" | Report | Rems 12'27"; Trdin 19'40", 20'25"; Tušar 25'45", 30'53" (pen.) |

Boråshallen, Borås
Attendance: 1,538
Referee: Joern Te Kloeze (The Netherlands), Jordan Griffiths (England)

=== Group D ===
| Pos | Team | Pld | W | D | L | GF | GA | GD | Pts | Qualification |
|---|---|---|---|---|---|---|---|---|---|---|
| 1 | (Denmark) Hjørring | 3 | 3 | 0 | 0 | 16 | 5 | +11 | 9 | Advance to main round |
| 2 | (Moldova) Clic Chișinău (H) | 3 | 2 | 0 | 1 | 15 | 8 | +7 | 6 | |
| 3 | (Cyprus) AEL | 3 | 1 | 0 | 2 | 7 | 18 | −11 | 3 | |
| 4 | (Israel) Maccabi Netanya | 3 | 0 | 0 | 3 | 4 | 11 | −7 | 0 | |

Source: UEFA
Rules for classification: Tiebreakers
(H) Hosts
26 August 2025
14:30

| Hjørring (Denmark) | 5–1 | (Israel) Maccabi Netanya |
|---|---|---|
| Pirata 4'16"; Dias Alves 22'32"; Andy Montoya 27'52"; Winther 33'19"; Toft Winther 38'12" | Report | Galgut 39'54" |

FMF Futsal Arena, Chișinău
Attendance: 50
Referee: Javier Moreno Reina (Spain), Laurentiu Ilie (San Marino)
26 August 2025
17:30

| AEL (Cyprus) | 1–11 | (Moldova) Clic Chișinău |
|---|---|---|
| Burdujel 15'50" (o.g.) | Report | Gurgurov 4'21", 6'42", 10'25", 16'00", 35'29"; Panayi 8'14" (o.g.); Obadă 14'53", 26'10", 39'46"; Vasilevschi 24'54"; Crasnov 37'02" |

FMF Futsal Arena, Chișinău
Attendance: 300
Referee: Alan Patchell (Ireland), Gordon Mccabe (Scotland)

27 August 2025
14:30

| AEL (Cyprus) | 2–5 | (Denmark) Hjørring |
|---|---|---|
| Sokratous 4'41"; Krekos 23'53" | Report | Carpes 1'56"; Gantzhorn 4'28"; Andy Montoya 22'47"; Winther 34'35"; Kasumović 39'55" |

FMF Futsal Arena, Chișinău
Attendance: 30
Referee: Gordon Mccabe (Scotland), Javier Moreno Reina (Spain)
27 August 2025
17:30

| Clic Chișinău (Moldova) | 2–1 | (Israel) Maccabi Netanya |
|---|---|---|
| Crasnov 19'48"; Moșneagu 20'35" | Report | Sukhashvili 31'19" |

FMF Futsal Arena, Chișinău
Attendance: 200
Referee: Laurentiu Ilie (San Marino), Alan Patchell (Ireland)

29 August 2025
14:30

| Maccabi Netanya (Israel) | 2–4 | (Cyprus) AEL |
|---|---|---|
| Arslanov 26'19", 29'32" | Report | Sokratous 2'12"; El Kebbe 17'14" (pen.), 28'38"; Skarparis 36'46" |

FMF Futsal Arena, Chișinău
Attendance: 20
Referee: Gordon Mccabe (Scotland), Laurentiu Ilie (San Marino)
29 August 2025
17:30

| Clic Chișinău (Moldova) | 2–6 | (Denmark) Hjørring |
|---|---|---|
| Vasilevschi 4'52"; Obadă 16'20"; Kasumović 10'02" | Report | Winther 16'29", 19'42" (pen.), 26'57", 34'44"; Gantzhorn 39'39" |

FMF Futsal Arena, Chișinău
Attendance: 300
Referee: Javier Moreno Reina (Spain), Alan Patchell (Ireland)

=== Group E ===
| Pos | Team | Pld | W | D | L | GF | GA | GD | Pts | Qualification |
|---|---|---|---|---|---|---|---|---|---|---|
| 1 | (Germany) Weilimdorf | 3 | 2 | 1 | 0 | 25 | 4 | +21 | 7 | Advance to main round |
| 2 | (Belarus) Viten Orsha | 3 | 2 | 1 | 0 | 27 | 8 | +19 | 7 | |
| 3 | (Bulgaria) Levski (H) | 3 | 1 | 0 | 2 | 10 | 23 | −13 | 3 | |
| 4 | (Gibraltar) Europa | 3 | 0 | 0 | 3 | 3 | 30 | −27 | 0 | |

Source: UEFA
Rules for classification: Tiebreakers
(H) Hosts
27 August 2025
15:00

| Viten Orsha (Belarus) | 10–1 | (Gibraltar) Europa |
|---|---|---|
| Brednev 1'00"; Rogovik 3'28"; Peremitin 4'13", 4'30", 13'11"; Lazyuk 15'58"; Zhigalko 16'36" (pen.); Manayenkov 24'24"; Razuvanov 26'06" (pen.); Rabyko 37'09" | Report | Caravante 1'53" |

Arena Armeec Sofia, Sofia
Attendance: 35
Referee: Norbert Szilágyi (Hungary), Elwyn Rhys Parry (Wales)
27 August 2025
18:00

| Weilimdorf (Germany) | 7–1 | (Bulgaria) Levski |
|---|---|---|
| Kennedy Ribeiro 8'45", 13'06"; Dervishaj 9'22", 33'39"; Džindić 10'25", 16'10"; Ridžal 36'10" | Report | Vasov 7'18" |

Arena Armeec Sofia, Sofia
Attendance: 215
Referee: Theocharis Theocharous (Cyprus), Ali Jabrayilov (Azerbaijan)

28 August 2025
15:00

| Weilimdorf (Germany) | 3–3 | (Belarus) Viten Orsha |
|---|---|---|
| Vehab 19'00"; Džindić 25'21"; Kennedy Ribeiro 26'40" | Report | Grünberg 6'34" (o.g.); Peremitin 26'01"; Kennedy Ribeiro 39'28" (o.g.) |

Arena Armeec Sofia, Sofia
Attendance: 50
Referee: Ali Jabrayilov (Azerbaijan), Norbert Szilágyi (Hungary)
28 August 2025
18:00

| Levski (Bulgaria) | 5–2 | (Gibraltar) Europa |
|---|---|---|
| D. Dimitrov 4'50"; Kuzov 9'30", 33'23"; Milanov 12'53"; M. Asenov 35'19" | Report | Consigliero 11'00"; El Andaloussi 36'34" |

Arena Armeec Sofia, Sofia
Attendance: 245
Referee: Elwyn Rhys Parry (Wales), Theocharis Theocharous (Cyprus)

30 August 2025
15:00

| Europa (Gibraltar) | 0–15 | (Germany) Weilimdorf |
|---|---|---|
| | Report | Džindić 1'14", 17'42" (pen.), 17'58" (pen.), 23'27", 33'02"; Ridžal 4'20", 9'58"; Vehab 5'20", 21'37", 34'39", 39'18"; Dervishaj 5'54", 15'20", 27'18", 37'44" |

Arena Armeec Sofia, Sofia
Attendance: 35
Referee: Ali Jabrayilov (Azerbaijan), Elwyn Rhys Parry (Wales)
30 August 2025
18:00

| Levski (Bulgaria) | 4–14 | (Belarus) Viten Orsha |
|---|---|---|
| Kuzov 0'16"; A. Asenov 7'23"; Vasov 25'03"; Tsvetanov 30'34" | Report | Sinitski 4'32"; Baldin 5'57", 14'29", 29'14", 35'20"; Rogovik 9'26", 18'19", 37'23"; Peremitin 11'51", 28'48", 32'04"; Martsinkevich 13'25"; Razuvanov 30'44"; Zhigalko 38'16" |

Arena Armeec Sofia, Sofia
Attendance: 470
Referee: Norbert Szilágyi (Hungary), Theocharis Theocharous (Cyprus)

=== Group F ===
| Pos | Team | Pld | W | D | L | GF | GA | GD | Pts | Qualification |
|---|---|---|---|---|---|---|---|---|---|---|
| 1 | (Azerbaijan) Araz | 3 | 3 | 0 | 0 | 28 | 6 | +22 | 9 | Advance to main round |
| 2 | (Austria) Ljuti Krajišnici (H) | 3 | 2 | 0 | 1 | 11 | 15 | −4 | 6 | |
| 3 | (Northern Ireland) Sparta Belfast | 3 | 1 | 0 | 2 | 8 | 13 | −5 | 3 | |
| 4 | (Scotland) PYF Saltires | 3 | 0 | 0 | 3 | 4 | 17 | −13 | 0 | |

Source: UEFA
Rules for classification: Tiebreakers
(H) Hosts
27 August 2025
17:00

| Araz (Azerbaijan) | 9–1 | (Northern Ireland) Sparta Belfast |
|---|---|---|
| Allex Rezende 2'35", 31'03"; U. Aliyev 3'53", 33'21"; Bertuola 10'30", 18'34", 30'10"; Alex Mineiro 11'10"; Jean Perruzo 37'04" | Report | Gibson 21'55" |

Sporthalle NMS Linz-Kleinmünchen, Linz
Attendance: 200
Referee: Filipe Duarte (Portugal), Orest Dutsiak (Ukraine)
27 August 2025
19:30

| PYF Saltires (Scotland) | 1–5 | (Austria) Ljuti Krajišnici |
|---|---|---|
| Aloulou 21'45" | Report | Karabegović 18'36"; Hasanbegović 19'27"; K. Ramić 34'55"; Bell 37'17" (o.g.); Mehić 38'05" |

Sporthalle NMS Linz-Kleinmünchen, Linz
Attendance: 600
Referee: Aleksandar Vangelov (Bulgaria), Vladimir Sebek (Montenegro)

28 August 2025
17:00

| PYF Saltires (Scotland) | 2–7 | (Azerbaijan) Araz |
|---|---|---|
| Ritchie 0'56"; Simpson 30'01" | Report | Jean Perruzo 5'44", 10'44"; Allex Rezende 11'12", 27'26"; Bertuola 13'19"; Luiggi Longo 17'11", 19'23" |

Sporthalle NMS Linz-Kleinmünchen, Linz
Attendance: 200
Referee: Vladimir Sebek (Montenegro), Filipe Duarte (Portugal)
28 August 2025
19:30

| Ljuti Krajišnici (Austria) | 3–2 | (Northern Ireland) Sparta Belfast |
|---|---|---|
| K. Ramić 12'42", 26'04"; E. Skrgić 22'59" | Report | Lowry 17'14"; M. Ramić 32'35" (o.g.) |

Sporthalle NMS Linz-Kleinmünchen, Linz
Attendance: 600
Referee: Orest Dutsiak (Ukraine), Aleksandar Vangelov (Bulgaria)

30 August 2025
17:00

| Sparta Belfast (Northern Ireland) | 5–1 | (Scotland) PYF Saltires |
|---|---|---|
| Roohi 0'50", 24'59"; McMenemy 23'22"; Elton Tavares 29'16"; Verenka 38'12" | Report | Gustavo 39'30" (o.g.) |

Sporthalle NMS Linz-Kleinmünchen, Linz
Attendance: 100
Referee: Vladimir Sebek (Montenegro), Aleksandar Vangelov (Bulgaria)
30 August 2025
19:30

| Ljuti Krajišnici (Austria) | 3–12 | (Azerbaijan) Araz |
|---|---|---|
| Hasanbegović 9'59"; Jean Perruzo 12'08" (o.g.); Mehić 28'55" | Report | Jean Perruzo 7'23"; Allex Rezende 10'13", 29'39"; Beglerović 10'34" (o.g.); Filipe Avila 10'50", 20'34", 30'43" (pen.), 31'44"; U. Aliyev 23'15"; Luiggi Longo 24'24"; Valerio 30'30"; Gasimzade 35'14" |

Sporthalle NMS Linz-Kleinmünchen, Linz
Attendance: 800
Referee: Filipe Duarte (Portugal), Orest Dutsiak (Ukraine)

=== Group G ===
| Pos | Team | Pld | W | D | L | GF | GA | GD | Pts | Qualification |
|---|---|---|---|---|---|---|---|---|---|---|
| 1 | (Bosnia and Herzegovina) Buba Mara (H) | 3 | 3 | 0 | 0 | 21 | 7 | +14 | 9 | Advance to main round |
| 2 | (Georgia (country)) CIU | 3 | 2 | 0 | 1 | 12 | 5 | +7 | 6 | |
| 3 | (Republic of Ireland) Blue Magic Dublin | 3 | 1 | 0 | 2 | 7 | 10 | −3 | 3 | |
| 4 | (Wales) Cardiff | 3 | 0 | 0 | 3 | 4 | 22 | −18 | 0 | |

Source: UEFA
Rules for classification: Tiebreakers
(H) Hosts
27 August 2025
17:00

| Blue Magic Dublin (Republic of Ireland) | 4–0 | (Wales) Cardiff |
|---|---|---|
| Beraldo 13'12", 26'55"; Lucas 25'50"; Minatti 36'04" | Report |

JU Sportski centar, Cazin
Attendance: 200
Referee: Jan Kresta (Czechia), Yauheni Zhalabkou (Belarus)
27 August 2025
21:00

| CIU (Georgia (country)) | 1–4 | (Bosnia and Herzegovina) Buba Mara |
|---|---|---|
| Giorgaia 17'52" | Report | Osredkar 18'31", 24'57"; Gosto 25'17"; Bosnić 34'38" |

JU Sportski centar, Cazin
Attendance: 1,038
Referee: Manuel Wolf (Austria), Bojan Graovac (Serbia)

28 August 2025
17:00

| CIU (Georgia (country)) | 4–1 | (Republic of Ireland) Blue Magic Dublin |
|---|---|---|
| Chimakadze 0'54"; Mangoshvili 9'05", 23'59"; Tkeshelashvili 32'55" | Report | Beraldo 29'41" |

JU Sportski centar, Cazin
Attendance: 100
Referee: Bojan Graovac (Serbia), Jan Kresta (Czechia)
28 August 2025
21:00

| Buba Mara (Bosnia and Herzegovina) | 11–4 | (Wales) Cardiff |
|---|---|---|
| Bundavica 4'08"; Kličić 7'06"; Brkanić 9'21", 13'42", 26'04"; Gosto 15'48"; Jelić 17'12"; Ibrišimović 26'46", 29'26"; Isanović 33'53"; Ramakić 38'34" | Report | Rahhahleh 12'06"; Howard 27'45"; Hugh 31'59"; Xavi Rodriguez 36'33" |

JU Sportski centar, Cazin
Attendance: 867
Referee: Yauheni Zhalabkou (Belarus), Manuel Wolf (Austria)

30 August 2025
17:00

| Cardiff (Wales) | 0–7 | (Georgia (country)) CIU |
|---|---|---|
| | Report | Tkeshelashvili 13'02", 18'18"; Tsereteli 20'38"; Bekauri 22'50"; Mangoshvili 27'27"; Machitidze 29'27"; Giorgaia 31'18" |

JU Sportski centar, Cazin
Attendance: 150
Referee: Bojan Graovac (Serbia), Yauheni Zhalabkou (Belarus)
30 August 2025
21:00

| Buba Mara (Bosnia and Herzegovina) | 6–2 | (Republic of Ireland) Blue Magic Dublin |
|---|---|---|
| Osredkar 5'12", 7'34", 32'44"; Gosto 7'50", 14'18"; Perić 19'40" | Report | Lucas 3'55" (pen.); Calderon 25'39" |

JU Sportski centar, Cazin
Attendance: 1,420
Referee: Jan Kresta (Czechia), Manuel Wolf (Austria)

=== Group H ===
| Pos | Team | Pld | W | D | L | GF | GA | GD | Pts | Qualification |
|---|---|---|---|---|---|---|---|---|---|---|
| 1 | (Greece) AEK Futsal (H) | 3 | 3 | 0 | 0 | 23 | 5 | +18 | 9 | Advance to main round |
| 2 | (Hungary) FC Veszprém | 3 | 2 | 0 | 1 | 16 | 8 | +8 | 6 | |
| 3 | (Norway) Sjarmtrollan Idrettslag | 3 | 0 | 1 | 2 | 7 | 17 | −10 | 1 | |
| 4 | (England) Bolton Futsal Club | 3 | 0 | 1 | 2 | 4 | 20 | −16 | 1 | |

Source: UEFA
Rules for classification: Tiebreakers
(H) Hosts
26 August 2025
17:30

| Veszprém (Hungary) | 7–0 | (England) Bolton |
|---|---|---|
| Dróth 0'59", 22'18"; Thiago Alves 3'13"; B. Horváth 5'30"; Lipl 12'46", 26'21", 30'06" | Report |

OACA Kasimatis Hall, Athens
Attendance: 50
Referee: Kaloyan Kirilov (Bulgaria), Emanuele Karbala (Switzerland)
26 August 2025
20:30

| Sjarmtrollan (Norway) | 1–8 | (Greece) AEK |
|---|---|---|
| Lind 20'22" | Report | Lima 2'19"; Adamopoulos 3'19", 19'17"; Tarnanidis 7'51"; Felipinho 13'36"; Vitinho 16'28"; Triantafyllos 32'58"; Nenê 36'49" (pen.) |

OACA Kasimatis Hall, Athens
Attendance: 400
Referee: Raafat Al Hamola (Israel), Jernej Petek (Slovenia)

27 August 2025
17:30

| Sjarmtrollan (Norway) | 2–5 | (Hungary) Veszprém |
|---|---|---|
| M. Vucenovic 8'12"; Eggen 27'58" | Report | Bognár 7'44"; Dróth 14'31", 28'12"; Lipl 30'21"; Thiago Alves 31'02" |

OACA Kasimatis Hall, Athens
Attendance: 43
Referee: Jernej Petek (Slovenia), Kaloyan Kirilov (Bulgaria)
27 August 2025
20:30

| AEK (Greece) | 9–0 | (England) Bolton |
|---|---|---|
| Lima 3'41", 9'24", 16'55"; Adamopoulos 5'13"; Felipinho 15'51"; Triantafyllos 19'36", 27'56"; Vitinho 26'27"; Kokkinidis 33'32" | Report |

OACA Kasimatis Hall, Athens
Attendance: 254
Referee: Emanuele Karbala (Switzerland), Raafat Al Hamola (Israel)

29 August 2025
17:30

| Bolton (England) | 4–4 | (Norway) Sjarmtrollan |
|---|---|---|
| McGrath 2'15", 6'54", 11'07"; Lawless 10'24" | Report | Kernohan 2'45" (o.g.); M. Vucenovic 4'50", 15'22"; Schjetne 22'31" |

OACA Kasimatis Hall, Athens
Attendance: 34
Referee: Jernej Petek (Slovenia), Emanuele Karbala (Switzerland)
29 August 2025
20:30

| AEK (Greece) | 6–4 | (Hungary) Veszprém |
|---|---|---|
| Felipinho 8'15", 9'11"; Adamopoulos 15'44", 25'50"; Nenê 23'47"; Vitinho 36'33" | Report | Lipl 16'40"; B. Horváth 25'30", 39'01"; Bognár 28'48" |

OACA Kasimatis Hall, Athens
Attendance: 600
Referee: Kaloyan Kirilov (Bulgaria), Raafat Al Hamola (Israel)

== Main round ==
The draw for the preliminary round was held on 3 July 2025, 14:00 CET. The main round was played from 28 October to 2 November 2025.

Times are CEST, as listed by UEFA (local times, if different, are in parentheses).

=== Seeding ===
A total of 32 teams played in the main round. They were divided in two paths:

- Path A (16 teams): The title holders and teams ranked 1–11 and 16–19. The top three teams in each group proceed to the elite round.
- Path B (16 teams): Teams ranked 12–15 and 20-23 and 8 teams advancing from the preliminary round. The winners of each group move on to the elite round.

Seeding of teams was based on their 2025 UEFA futsal club coefficients. On Path B, the teams ranked 12th to 15th were in seeding position 1 and those ranked 20th to 23rd in position 2. The remaining preliminary round winners were in a further pot to fill positions 3 and 4.

Eight teams (four in each path) were pre-selected as hosts and were first drawn from a separate pot to their corresponding seeding position. The remaining teams were then drawn from their respective pots to their corresponding seeding position. Teams from Armenia & Azerbaijan could not be drawn into the same group.

=== Path A ===
==== Group 1 ====
| Pos | Team | Pld | W | D | L | GF | GA | GD | Pts | Qualification |
|---|---|---|---|---|---|---|---|---|---|---|
| 1 | (Spain) Jimbee Cartagena | 3 | 2 | 1 | 0 | 9 | 0 | +9 | 7 | Advance to elite round |
| 2 | (Poland) Piast Gliwice (H) | 3 | 2 | 1 | 0 | 5 | 2 | +3 | 7 | Advance to elite round |
| 3 | (Belgium) Anderlecht | 3 | 1 | 0 | 2 | 5 | 6 | −1 | 3 | Advance to elite round |
| 4 | (Lithuania) Kauno Žalgiris | 3 | 0 | 0 | 3 | 1 | 12 | −11 | 0 | |

Source: UEFA
Rules for classification: Tiebreakers
(H) Hosts
30 October 2025
16:00

| Jimbee Cartagena (Spain) | 5–0 | (Lithuania) Kauno Žalgiris |
|---|---|---|
| Waltinho 2'36"; Tomaz Braga 4'05"; Da Silva De Abreu 15'44", 26'19"; Francisco Cortés 23'31" | Report |

Gliwice Arena, Gliwice
Attendance: 1471
Referee: Telmen Undrakh (Norway), Farik Kečo (Bosnia and Herzegovina)
30 October 2025
19:00

| Anderlecht (Belgium) | 1–2 | (Poland) Piast Gliwice |
|---|---|---|
| Raúl Jiménez 3'05" | Report | Miguel Ângelo 15'57"; Rangel 21'26" (o.g.) |

Gliwice Arena, Gliwice
Attendance: 10 357
Referee: Besar Beqiri (Kosovo), Peter Budáč (Slovakia)

31 October 2025
16:00

| Anderlecht (Belgium) | 0–4 | (Spain) Jimbee Cartagena |
|---|---|---|
| | Report | Tarakanovs 11'46" (o.g.); Waltinho 23'55", 36'25"; Osamanmusa 28'46" |

Gliwice Arena, Gliwice
Attendance: 253
Referee: Peter Budáč (Slovakia), Telmen Undrakh (Norway)
31 October 2025
19:00

| Piast Gliwice (Poland) | 3–1 | (Lithuania) Kauno Žalgiris |
|---|---|---|
| Miguel Ângelo 34'00"; Vinicius Teixeira 34'25"; Breno Bertoline 39'20" (pen.) | Report | Macedo Da Silva 31'36" |

Gliwice Arena, Gliwice
Attendance: 537
Referee: Farik Kečo (Bosnia and Herzegovina), Besar Beqiri (Kosovo)

2 November 2025
16:00

| Kauno Žalgiris (Lithuania) | 0–4 | (Belgium) Anderlecht |
|---|---|---|
| | Report | Raúl Jiménez 11'33"; Gréllo 15'47"; Darlan 17'06", 34'23" |

Gliwice Arena, Gliwice
Attendance: 407
Referee: Telmen Undrakh (Norway), Peter Budáč (Slovakia)
2 November 2025
19:00

| Piast Gliwice (Poland) | 0–0 | (Spain) Jimbee Cartagena |
|---|---|---|
| | Report |

Gliwice Arena, Gliwice
Attendance: 1077
Referee: Farik Kečo (Bosnia and Herzegovina), Besar Beqiri (Kosovo)

==== Group 2 ====
| Pos | Team | Pld | W | D | L | GF | GA | GD | Pts | Qualification |
|---|---|---|---|---|---|---|---|---|---|---|
| 1 | (Spain) Palma Futsal (H) | 3 | 3 | 0 | 0 | 12 | 6 | +6 | 9 | Advance to elite round |
| 2 | (France) Étoile Lavalloise | 3 | 2 | 0 | 1 | 11 | 6 | +5 | 6 | Advance to elite round |
| 3 | (Kazakhstan) Futsal Club Semey | 3 | 1 | 0 | 2 | 16 | 16 | 0 | 3 | Advance to elite round |
| 4 | (Czech Republic) MFK Chrudim | 3 | 0 | 0 | 3 | 7 | 18 | −11 | 0 | |

Source: UEFA
Rules for classification: Tiebreakers
(H) Hosts
29 October 2025
16:30

| Futsal Club Semey (Kazakhstan) | 9–5 | (Czech Republic) MFK Chrudim |
|---|---|---|
| Gabriel Candido 6'59", 22'01", 27'14"; Bruno Gomes 10'18", 19'56"; Yesenamanov 21'10"; Gereykhanov 23'24"; Marcelo 25'56"; Abdumanapuly 39'01" | Report | Mykhailo Grytsyna 4'54"; Seidler 6'41", 12'47"; Záruba 17'33"; D. Drozd 24'15" |

Palau Municipal d'Esports Son Moix, Palma de Mallorca
Attendance: 350
Referee: Jiri Bergs (Belgium), Ivan Ivanov (Bulgaria)
29 October 2025
19:30

| Étoile Lavalloise (France) | 1–2 | (Spain) Palma Futsal |
|---|---|---|
| Mouhoudine 10'29" | Report | Fabinho 20'53"; Charuto 35'26" |

Palau Municipal d'Esports Son Moix, Palma de Mallorca
Attendance: 2053
Referee: Denys Kutsyi (Ukraine), Sergejs Šacmans (Latvia)

30 October 2025
16:30

| Étoile Lavalloise (France) | 4–3 | (Kazakhstan) Futsal Club Semey |
|---|---|---|
| Mouhoudine 27'08", 27'48"; Guirio 29'50"; B. Bakkali 38'13" | Report | Bruno Gomes 2'11"; Dedezinho 7'28", 16'22" |

Palau Municipal d'Esports Son Moix, Palma de Mallorca
Attendance: 120
Referee: Sergejs Šacmans (Latvia), Denys Kutsyi (Ukraine)
30 October 2025
19:30

| Palma Futsal (Spain) | 3–1 | (Czech Republic) MFK Chrudim |
|---|---|---|
| Alisson 10'45", 27'55"; Ernesto 26'33" | Report | P. Drozd 18'23" |

Palau Municipal d'Esports Son Moix, Palma de Mallorca
Attendance: 1748
Referee: Ivan Ivanov (Bulgaria), Jiri Bergs (Belgium)

1 November 2025
16:30

| MFK Chrudim (Czech Republic) | 1–6 | (France) Étoile Lavalloise |
|---|---|---|
| Tomek 34'49" | Report | Mouhoudine 9'00", 29'14"; El Mesrar 18'07"; A. Mohammed 18'57"; Záruba 19'55" (o.g.); Balog 38'47" (o.g.) |

Palau Municipal d'Esports Son Moix, Palma de Mallorca
Attendance: 150
Referee: Jiri Bergs (Belgium), Sergejs Šacmans (Latvia)
1 November 2025
19:30

| Palma Futsal (Spain) | 7–4 | (Kazakhstan) Futsal Club Semey |
|---|---|---|
| Machado 1'05"; Gereykhanov 4'29" (o.g.); Alisson 10'55", 17'05", 19'35"; Lin 12'34"; Gabriel Candido 30'19" (o.g.) | Report | Marcelo 10'12", 20'42"; Bruno Gomes 12'22", 32'03" |

Palau Municipal d'Esports Son Moix, Palma de Mallorca
Attendance: 2478
Referee: Denys Kutsyi (Ukraine), Ivan Ivanov (Bulgaria)

==== Group 3 ====
| Pos | Team | Pld | W | D | L | GF | GA | GD | Pts | Qualification |
|---|---|---|---|---|---|---|---|---|---|---|
| 1 | (Portugal) SL Benfica | 3 | 3 | 0 | 0 | 21 | 2 | +19 | 9 | Advance to elite round |
| 2 | (Latvia) Riga FC | 3 | 2 | 0 | 1 | 7 | 7 | 0 | 6 | Advance to elite round |
| 3 | (Malta) Luxol St Andrews (H) | 3 | 0 | 1 | 2 | 6 | 14 | −8 | 1 | Advance to elite round |
| 4 | (Serbia) KMF Loznica | 3 | 0 | 1 | 2 | 4 | 15 | −11 | 1 | |

Source: UEFA
Rules for classification: Tiebreakers
(H) Hosts
29 October 2025
16:30

| SL Benfica (Portugal) | 9–0 | (Serbia) KMF Loznica |
|---|---|---|
| Kutchy 1'08", 28'18"; Diego Nunes 13'55"; Higor de Souza 15'00"; Afonso Jesus 19'59"; Arthur 21'26"; Raúl Moreira 21'56"; André Coelho 27'07"; Silvestre Ferreira 34'11" | Report |

Tal-Qroqq University Sports Hall, Gżira
Attendance: 86
Referee: Vlad Nicolae Ciobanu (Romania), Knyaz Amiraslanov (Azerbaijan)
29 October 2025
19:00

| Riga FC (Latvia) | 4–1 | (Malta) Luxol St Andrews |
|---|---|---|
| Gleison Daniel 3'55"; Jhonata Silva 8'39"; Bruno Coelho 9'28"; Vargas 17'22" | Report | Jhonata Silva 23'17" (o.g.) |

Tal-Qroqq University Sports Hall, Gżira
Attendance: 217
Referee: Trayan Enchev (Bulgaria), Sławomir Steczko (Poland)

30 October 2025
16:30

| Riga FC (Latvia) | 1–6 | (Portugal) SL Benfica |
|---|---|---|
| Vargas 39'36" | Report | Silvestre Ferreira 1'30"; Arthur 6'41"; Carlos Monteiro 17'51"; Jacaré 19'42"; Afonso Jesus 23'47"; Kutchy 35'41" |

Tal-Qroqq University Sports Hall, Gżira
Attendance: 75
Referee: Sławomir Steczko (Poland), Vlad Nicolae Ciobanu (Romania)
30 October 2025
19:00

| Luxol St Andrews (Malta) | 4–4 | (Serbia) KMF Loznica |
|---|---|---|
| Vevé 4'48", 39'48"; Leanderson 30'07"; C. Alves 34'26" | Report | Spasić 9'28"; Avramović 12'00"; Jânio 13'30"; Martins 18'11" |

Tal-Qroqq University Sports Hall, Gżira
Attendance: 156
Referee: Knyaz Amiraslanov (Azerbaijan), Trayan Enchev (Bulgaria)

1 November 2025
16:30

| KMF Loznica (Serbia) | 0–2 | (Latvia) Riga FC |
|---|---|---|
| | Report | Fradick Goes 30'25"; Vargas 33'40" |

Tal-Qroqq University Sports Hall, Gżira
Attendance: 77
Referee: Vlad Nicolae Ciobanu (Romania), Trayan Enchev (Bulgaria)
1 November 2025
19:00

| Luxol St Andrews (Malta) | 1–6 | (Portugal) SL Benfica |
|---|---|---|
| Luiz Murad 7'05" | Report | Afonso Jesus 2'32"; Kutchy 3'44", 18'08"; Diego Nunes 19'18"; Silva 36'18"; Higor de Souza 37'07" |

Tal-Qroqq University Sports Hall, Gżira
Attendance: 250
Referee: Sławomir Steczko (Poland), Knyaz Amiraslanov (Azerbaijan)

==== Group 4 ====
| Pos | Team | Pld | W | D | L | GF | GA | GD | Pts | Qualification |
|---|---|---|---|---|---|---|---|---|---|---|
| 1 | (Portugal) Sporting CP | 3 | 3 | 0 | 0 | 30 | 2 | +28 | 9 | Advance to elite round |
| 2 | (Kazakhstan) Kairat | 3 | 2 | 0 | 1 | 9 | 10 | −1 | 6 | Advance to elite round |
| 3 | (Kosovo) FC Prishtina 01 | 3 | 1 | 0 | 2 | 9 | 29 | −20 | 3 | Advance to elite round |
| 4 | (Croatia) Vrijeme Makarska (H) | 3 | 0 | 0 | 3 | 8 | 14 | −6 | 0 | |

Source: UEFA
Rules for classification: Tiebreakers
(H) Hosts
29 October 2025
17:00

| Sporting CP (Portugal) | 19–1 | (Kosovo) FC Prishtina 01 |
|---|---|---|
| Merlim 1'32"; Tomás Paçó 2'14", 20'48"; Pauleta 5'14", 6'01"; João Matos 8'48"; Zicky 10'49"; Vinicius Rocha 11'40", 25'12", 36'15"; Guilherme 15'45"; Wesley França 17'14", 33'50"; Bruno Pinto 18'08", 29'22"; Diogo Santos 23'59"; Bruno Maior 28'23", 37'11"; Felipe Valério 35'05" | Report | Maxharraj 0'15" |

Gradski Sportski Centar Makarska, Makarska
Attendance: 150
Referee: Lars van Leeuwen (The Netherlands), Nicolas Nicolaou (Cyprus)
29 October 2025
20:00

| Kairat (Kazakhstan) | 3–2 | (Croatia) Vrijeme Makarska |
|---|---|---|
| Orazov 7'12", 8'37"; Edson 15'28" | Report | Vitor Hugo 23'43"; Jonhn Lennon 39'46" |

Gradski Sportski Centar Makarska, Makarska
Attendance: 750
Referee: Ingus Puriņš (Latvia), Liviu Dumitru Chiţă (Romania)

30 October 2025
17:00

| Kairat (Kazakhstan) | 2–7 | (Portugal) Sporting CP |
|---|---|---|
| Arrieta 10'55"; Tursagulov 15'40" | Report | Zicky 0'12"; Tomás Paçó 6'23"; Diogo Santos 9'18", 11'02"; Felipe Valério 12'39", 24'06"; Wesley França 25'35" |

Gradski Sportski Centar Makarska, Makarska
Attendance: 350
Referee: Liviu Dumitru Chiţă (Romania), Lars van Leeuwen (The Netherlands)
30 October 2025
20:00

| Vrijeme Makarska (Croatia) | 6–7 | (Kosovo) FC Prishtina 01 |
|---|---|---|
| Rukovci 6'09" (o.g.); Ramadani 9'45" (o.g.); Jelavić 12'22", 32'08"; Jonhn Lennon 20'12"; Lasić 35'41" | Report | Selmanaj 1'43", 6'59", 15'08"; Limani 12'34"; Rukovci 25'41"; Krasniqi 31'15"; Alaj 38'53" |

Gradski Sportski Centar Makarska, Makarska
Attendance: 920
Referee: Nicolas Nicolaou (Cyprus), Ingus Puriņš (Latvia)

1 November 2025
17:00

| FC Prishtina 01 (Kosovo) | 1–4 | (Kazakhstan) Kairat |
|---|---|---|
| Rômulo 22'58" (o.g.) | Report | Orazov 4'35", 29'42"; Arrieta 16'13"; Athirson Silva 33'50" |

Gradski Sportski Centar Makarska, Makarska
Attendance: 100
Referee: Lars van Leeuwen (The Netherlands), Ingus Puriņš (Latvia)
1 November 2025
20:00

| Vrijeme Makarska (Croatia) | 0–4 | (Portugal) Sporting CP |
|---|---|---|
| | Report | Rafagnin 1'05"; Guilherme 12'30"; Bruno Pinto 14'18"; Merlim 30'31" |

Gradski Sportski Centar Makarska, Makarska
Attendance: 800
Referee: Liviu Dumitru Chiţă (Romania), Nicolas Nicolaou (Cyprus)

=== Path B ===
==== Group 5 ====
| Pos | Team | Pld | W | D | L | GF | GA | GD | Pts | Qualification |
|---|---|---|---|---|---|---|---|---|---|---|
| 1 | (Greece) AEK Futsal | 3 | 2 | 1 | 0 | 18 | 7 | +11 | 7 (Note: Ranked on disciplinary points: AEK -10, Catania -11.) | Advance to elite round |
| 2 | (Italy) Meta Catania C5 (H) | 3 | 2 | 1 | 0 | 18 | 7 | +11 | 7 | |
| 3 | (Finland) Akaa Futsal | 3 | 1 | 0 | 2 | 9 | 15 | −6 | 3 | |
| 4 | (Germany) Weilimdorf | 3 | 0 | 0 | 3 | 3 | 19 | −16 | 0 | |

Source: UEFA
Rules for classification: Tiebreakers
(H) Hosts
Notes:
29 October 2025
17:00

| Akaa Futsal (Finland) | 2–6 | (Greece) AEK Futsal |
|---|---|---|
| Filppu 9'45"; Rautiainen 34'23" | Report | Vitinho 18'40", 22'50", 37'53"; Nenê 24'09"; Adamopoulos 34'55"; Lima 35'49" |

PalaCatania, Catania
Attendance: 100
Referee: Yiangos Yiangou (Cyprus), Filip Nešnera (Czechia)
29 October 2025
20:30

| Weilimdorf (Germany) | 1–6 | (Italy) Meta Catania C5 |
|---|---|---|
| Džindić 14'53" | Report | Podda 13'29", 14'44", 28'28"; Drahovský 28'38"; Pozzer Sacon 39'29"; Brunelli 39'50" |

PalaCatania, Catania
Attendance: 1100
Referee: Besart Ismajli (Kosovo), Dražen Vukčević (Montenegro)

30 October 2025
17:00

| Weilimdorf (Germany) | 0–4 | (Finland) Akaa Futsal |
|---|---|---|
| | Report | Pretão 2'19"; Rautiainen 10'33"; Pulkkinen 14'20"; Pulkkinen 19'12" (pen.) |

PalaCatania, Catania
Attendance: 150
Referee: Dražen Vukčević (Montenegro), Yiangos Yiangou (Cyprus)
30 October 2025
20:30

| Meta Catania C5 (Italy) | 3–3 | (Greece) AEK Futsal |
|---|---|---|
| Turmena 9'01", 30'38"; Pulvirenti 32'19" | Report | Lima 0'20"; Felipinho 15'46", 21'33" |

PalaCatania, Catania
Attendance: 980
Referee: Filip Nešnera (Czechia), Besart Ismajli (Kosovo)

1 November 2025
17:00

| AEK Futsal (Greece) | 9–2 | (Germany) Weilimdorf |
|---|---|---|
| Felipinho 0'08", 1'31", 39'37"; Adamopoulos 3'26"; Nenê 13'45"; Lima 21'01"; Ntatis 26'36", 32'40"; Kokkinidis 34'51" | Report | Džindić 10'43"; Redzepi 17'40" |

PalaCatania, Catania
Attendance: 100
Referee: Besart Ismajli (Kosovo), Yiangos Yiangou (Cyprus)
1 November 2025
20:30

| Meta Catania C5 (Italy) | 9–3 | (Finland) Akaa Futsal |
|---|---|---|
| Turmena 9'40", 30'01" (pen.); Pozzer Sacon 18'25", 18'37"; C. Musumeci 24'55", 38'46"; Podda 25'04"; Jaakko Alasuutari 28'29" (o.g.); Brunelli 33'44" | Report | Kangas 3'08"; Rautiainen 11'40"; Pretão 30'57" |

PalaCatania, Catania
Attendance: 2100
Referee: Filip Nešnera (Czechia), Dražen Vukčević (Montenegro)

==== Group 6 ====
| Pos | Team | Pld | W | D | L | GF | GA | GD | Pts | Qualification |
|---|---|---|---|---|---|---|---|---|---|---|
| 1 | (Denmark) Hjørring | 3 | 2 | 0 | 1 | 13 | 18 | −5 | 6 | Advance to elite round |
| 2 | (Bosnia and Herzegovina) Buba Mara | 3 | 1 | 1 | 1 | 13 | 9 | +4 | 4 | |
| 3 | (Switzerland) Futsal Minerva | 3 | 1 | 1 | 1 | 9 | 9 | 0 | 4 | |
| 4 | (Slovakia) MIMEL Lučenec (H) | 3 | 1 | 0 | 2 | 9 | 8 | +1 | 3 | |

Source: UEFA
Rules for classification: Tiebreakers
(H) Hosts
29 October 2025
16:00

| Futsal Minerva (Switzerland) | 4–5 | (Denmark) Hjørring |
|---|---|---|
| Kasumović 7'00" (o.g.); D. Tomić 32'17" (pen.); Ryan Gomes 34'19"; Halimi 38'47" | Report | Gantzhorn 6'28", 8'20"; Lourran 6'47", 38'18"; Pirata 14'22" |

Športová hala Arena, Lučenec
Attendance: 150
Referee: Peter Nurse (England), Simone Zanfino (Italy)
29 October 2025
19:00

| Buba Mara (Bosnia and Herzegovina) | 0–4 | (Slovakia) MIMEL Lučenec |
|---|---|---|
| | Report | Vuletić 2'11"; Mičuda 17'06"; Ševčík 18'25"; Greško 23'55" |

Športová hala Arena, Lučenec
Attendance: 900
Referee: Vasilios Christodoulis (Greece), Yevhen Hordiienko (Ukraine)

30 October 2025
16:00

| Buba Mara (Bosnia and Herzegovina) | 1–1 | (Switzerland) Futsal Minerva |
|---|---|---|
| Leo Costamanha 17'04" (o.g.) | Report | D. Tomić 31'22" |

Športová hala Arena, Lučenec
Attendance: 500
Referee: Yevhen Hordiienko (Ukraine), Peter Nurse (England)
30 October 2025
19:00

| MIMEL Lučenec (Slovakia) | 2–4 | (Denmark) Hjørring |
|---|---|---|
| Ševčík 2'23"; Romero 9'16" | Report | Rafael 18'24" (o.g.); Gantzhorn 25'03"; Pirata 27'36"; Carpes 36'22" |

Športová hala Arena, Lučenec
Attendance: 1000
Referee: Simone Zanfino (Italy), Vasilios Christodoulis (Greece)

1 November 2025
16:00

| Hjørring (Denmark) | 4–12 | (Bosnia and Herzegovina) Buba Mara |
|---|---|---|
| Kasumović 0'54"; Pirata 14'17", 14'47"; Sørensen 27'29" | Report | Loubani 5'15" (o.g.); Osredkar 7'18", 33'59"; Bosnić 10'41", 36'51"; Čeh 12'35"; Ibrišimović 13'43", 37'35"; Bundavica 20'08"; Gosto 20'58", 34'48"; Perić 28'27" |

Športová hala Arena, Lučenec
Attendance: 206
Referee: Simone Zanfino (Italy), Yevhen Hordiienko (Ukraine)
1 November 2025
19:00

| MIMEL Lučenec (Slovakia) | 3–4 | (Switzerland) Futsal Minerva |
|---|---|---|
| Vuletić 5'48"; Encinas 10'26" (o.g.); Jose Wellington 19'12" | Report | Luis Fernando 15'02"; D. Tomić 19'31"; Ryan Gomes 23'24", 23'48" |

Športová hala Arena, Lučenec
Attendance: 900
Referee: Vasilios Christodoulis (Greece), Peter Nurse (England)

==== Group 7 ====
| Pos | Team | Pld | W | D | L | GF | GA | GD | Pts | Qualification |
|---|---|---|---|---|---|---|---|---|---|---|
| 1 | (Azerbaijan) Araz | 3 | 2 | 1 | 0 | 7 | 5 | +2 | 7 | Advance to elite round |
| 2 | (Netherlands) Tigers Roermond | 3 | 2 | 0 | 1 | 14 | 9 | +5 | 6 | |
| 3 | (Romania) United Galați (H) | 3 | 1 | 0 | 2 | 8 | 11 | −3 | 3 | |
| 4 | (Luxembourg) Differdange 03 | 3 | 0 | 1 | 2 | 12 | 16 | −4 | 1 | |

Source: UEFA
Rules for classification: Tiebreakers
(H) Hosts
29 October 2025
16:00

| Differdange 03 (Luxembourg) | 5–8 | (Netherlands) Tigers Roermond |
|---|---|---|
| Rúben Reis 8'39"; Teka 19'40", 34'53"; Areco Cabrera 24'04"; Robinho 33'20" | Report | Boukhari 3'29"; M'Rabet-Eloued 4'43"; Mossaoui 7'37", 13'40"; Charraoui 8'31"; Tamoukh 18'53", 30'45"; Chadli 32'13" |

Dunărea Sports Hall, Galați
Attendance: 237
Referee: Victor Chaix (France), Irmantas Kaprašovas (Lithuania)
29 October 2025
19:00

| Araz (Azerbaijan) | 2–1 | (Romania) United Galați |
|---|---|---|
| Alex Mineiro 24'54"; Filipe Avila 33'08" | Report | Nastai 26'47" |

Dunărea Sports Hall, Galați
Attendance: 1542
Referee: Aslan Galayev (Kazakhstan), Valentin Ciuplea (Wales)

30 October 2025
16:00

| Araz (Azerbaijan) | 2–2 | (Luxembourg) Differdange 03 |
|---|---|---|
| Jean Perruzo 15'52"; Luiggi Longo 38'35" | Report | Rúben Reis 27'45"; Robinho 36'51" |

Dunărea Sports Hall, Galați
Attendance: 153
Referee: Valentin Ciuplea (Wales), Victor Chaix (France)
30 October 2025
19:00

| United Galați (Romania) | 1–4 | (Netherlands) Tigers Roermond |
|---|---|---|
| Cojocaru 4'02" | Report | Borite 28'44"; Charraoui 32'02"; M'Rabet-Eloued 33'47"; Meyers 38'49" |

Dunărea Sports Hall, Galați
Attendance: 1523
Referee: Irmantas Kaprašovas (Lithuania), Aslan Galayev (Kazakhstan)

1 November 2025
15:00

| Tigers Roermond (Netherlands) | 2–3 | (Azerbaijan) Araz |
|---|---|---|
| Charraoui 18'54", 25'24" | Report | Valerio 10'29", 39'10"; Jean Perruzo 29'51" |

Dunărea Sports Hall, Galați
Attendance: 112
Referee: Victor Chaix (France), Aslan Galayev (Kazakhstan)
1 November 2025
18:00

| United Galați (Romania) | 6–5 | (Luxembourg) Differdange 03 |
|---|---|---|
| An. Sasse 3'11", 20'22", 26'18"; Crișan 8'39"; Cojocaru 15'57", 18'02" | Report | Oliveira Garrido 21'42"; Teka 28'24"; Rúben Reis 34'39", 35'03" (pen.), 36'44" |

Dunărea Sports Hall, Galați
Attendance: 975
Referee: Valentin Ciuplea (Wales), Irmantas Kaprašovas (Lithuania)

==== Group 8 ====
| Pos | Team | Pld | W | D | L | GF | GA | GD | Pts | Qualification |
|---|---|---|---|---|---|---|---|---|---|---|
| 1 | (Ukraine) FC HIT | 3 | 3 | 0 | 0 | 17 | 3 | +14 | 9 | Advance to elite round |
| 2 | (Ukraine) Kyiv Futsal | 3 | 1 | 1 | 1 | 12 | 7 | +5 | 4 | |
| 3 | (Slovenia) Vrhnika (H) | 3 | 1 | 1 | 1 | 7 | 6 | +1 | 4 | |
| 4 | (North Macedonia) FORCA | 3 | 0 | 0 | 3 | 4 | 24 | −20 | 0 | |

Source: UEFA
Rules for classification: Tiebreakers
(H) Hosts
29 October 2025
17:00

| FC HIT (Ukraine) | 10–2 | (North Macedonia) FORCA |
|---|---|---|
| Cherniavskyi 4'57"; Pediash 8'15", 28'20", 32'35"; Melnyk 10'21", 30'59"; Ygor Postigo 14'32" (o.g.); Pervieiev 18'20"; Zhuk 21'26", 27'12" | Report | Ramadani 13'38"; Chiljafi 39'43" |

Slovan, Ljubljana
Attendance: 225
Referee: Julien Lang (France), Turekhan Tursumbayev (Kazakhstan)
29 October 2025
20:00

| Kyiv Futsal (Ukraine) | 2–2 | (Slovenia) Vrhnika |
|---|---|---|
| Grytsyna 14'20"; Kayque Mendes 34'55" | Report | Ciuha 23'45"; Tušar 34'01" |

Slovan, Ljubljana
Attendance: 750
Referee: Kirill Naishouler (Finland), Kastriot Gerxhaliu (Sweden)

30 October 2025
17:00

| Kyiv Futsal (Ukraine) | 0–5 | (Ukraine) FC HIT |
|---|---|---|
| | Report | Podliuk 2'02"; Sahaidachnyi 15'55", 36'55", 39'58"; Sukhov 37'25" |

Slovan, Ljubljana
Attendance: 250
Referee: Kastriot Gerxhaliu (Sweden), Julien Lang (France)
30 October 2025
20:00

| Vrhnika (Slovenia) | 4–2 | (North Macedonia) FORCA |
|---|---|---|
| Rems 2'02"; Ciuha 3'27", 36'27", 37'31" | Report | Jesus Rivas 12'10"; Debeljak 19'42" (o.g.) |

Slovan, Ljubljana
Attendance: 600
Referee: Turekhan Tursumbayev (Kazakhstan), Kirill Naishouler (Finland)

1 November 2025
16:00

| FORCA (North Macedonia) | 0–10 | (Ukraine) Kyiv Futsal |
|---|---|---|
| | Report | Shcherytsia 3'19", 5'38", 34'17"; Kayque Mendes 16'30"; Zvarych 27'53"; Grytsyna 28'42"; Vinicius 29'56"; Sander De Freitas 31'43"; Litvinov 33'19"; Mospan 35'07" |

Slovan, Ljubljana
Attendance: 140
Referee: Turekhan Tursumbayev (Kazakhstan), Kastriot Gerxhaliu (Sweden)
1 November 2025
19:00

| Vrhnika (Slovenia) | 1–2 | (Ukraine) FC HIT |
|---|---|---|
| Pervieiev 12'47" (o.g.) | Report | Pervieiev 26'19"; Cherniavskyi 39'48" |

Slovan, Ljubljana
Attendance: 1300
Referee: Julien Lang (France), Kirill Naishouler (Finland)

== Knockout stage ==
The knockout round consisted of a round of 16 and the quarter-finals. The round of 16 contenders were decided by the main round, with 12 teams emerging from Path A and four from Path B. The two-legged round of 16 and quarter-final stages replace the former elite round under the new format for 2025/26. Ties scheduled for 24 November and 5 December, with the first-named team at home in the opening leg.

The final tournament was a one-venue four-team knockout event held in Pesaro, Italy, with the semi-finals taking place on 8 May and the final and third-place match two days later. A separate draw was held to set the semi-finals.

The draw was held on 6 November 2025 at 14:00 CET.

=== Bracket ===
Round of 16
(Belgium) Anderlecht | 3 | 3 | 6
(Kazakhstan) Kairat | 7 | 5 | 12
(Malta) Luxol St Andrews | 1 | 1 | 2
(Spain) Jimbee Cartagena | 9 | 5 | 14
(Azerbaijan) Araz | 0 | 2 | 2
(Portugal) Benfica | 9 | 4 | 13
(Greece) AEK Futsal | 0 | 3 | 3
(Portugal) Sporting CP | 11 | 8 | 19
(Ukraine) FC HIT | 2 | 2 | 4
(Spain) Palma Futsal | 2 | 4 | 6
(Kosovo) FC Prishtina 01 | 3 | 1 | 4
(Latvia) Riga FC | 3 | 8 | 11
(Denmark) Hjørring | 1 | 4 | 5
(France) Étoile Lavalloise | 4 | 7 | 11
(Kazakhstan) Futsal Club Semey | 3 | 5 | 8
(Poland) Piast Gliwice | 3 | 3 | 6

Quarter-finals
(Kazakhstan) Kairat | 1 | 4 | 5
(Spain) Jimbee Cartagena | 2 | 7 | 9
(Portugal) Benfica | 4 | 4 | 8
(Portugal) Sporting CP | 3 | 7 | 10
(Spain) Palma Futsal | 7 | 0 | 7
(Latvia) Riga FC | 4 | 1 | 5
(France) Étoile Lavalloise | 5 | 3 | 8
(Kazakhstan) Futsal Club Semey | 4 | 2 | 6

Semi-finals
8 May 2026 – Pesaro
(Spain) Jimbee Cartagena | 3 (5)
(Portugal) Sporting CP (p) | 3 (6)
8 May 2026 – Pesaro
(Spain) Palma Futsal (p) | 6 (5)
(France) Étoile Lavalloise | 6 (4)

Final
10 May 2026 – Pesaro
(Portugal) Sporting CP | 2
(Spain) Palma Futsal | 0
Third place
10 May 2026 – Pesaro
(Spain) Jimbee Cartagena (p) | 3 (5)
(France) Étoile Lavalloise | 3 (4)

=== Matches ===
Times are CET (UTC+1), as listed by UEFA (local times, if different, are in parentheses).

==== Round of 16 ====
24 November 2025
19:00

| Hjørring (Denmark) | 1–4 | (France) Étoile Lavalloise |
|---|---|---|
| Pirata 27'39" | Report | Lutin 8'41"; El Mesrar 13'32" (pen.), 34'40"; A. Mohammed 38'16" |

Park Vendia Hallen, Hjorring
Attendance: 1100
Referee: Dejan Veselič (Slovenia)
1 December 2025
20:30

| Étoile Lavalloise (France) | 7–4 | (Denmark) Hjørring |
|---|---|---|
| B. Bakkali 9'06", 12'01"; A. Bakkali 14'51"; Megrous 18'23"; Mouhoudine 21'30", 23'07"; T. Kolski 27'16" | Report | Winther 20'53"; Loubani 29'34", 36'27"; Kasumovic 33'48" |

Espace Mayenne, Laval
Attendance: 3300
Referee: George Jansizian (Sweden)

Étoile Lavalloise won 11–5 on aggregate.

24 November 2025
16:00 (20:00 UTC+5)

| Futsal Club Semey (Kazakhstan) | 3–3 | (Poland) Piast Gliwice |
|---|---|---|
| Dedezinho 3'46", 34'10"; Gereykhanov 20'51" | Report | Vinicius Teixeira 34'42", 35'12"; Bruno Graça 39'57" |

Abay Arena, Semey
Attendance: 4823
Referee: Nicola Manzione (Italy)
5 December 2025
19:00

| Piast Gliwice (Poland) | 3–5 | (Kazakhstan) Futsal Club Semey |
|---|---|---|
| Korpela 0'12"; Breno Bertoline 5'45"; Micuim 30'54" | Report | Piyaly 17'40"; Turegazin 19'35", 30'05"; Pedrinho 27'51"; Marcelo 39'02" |

Gliwice Arena, Gliwice
Attendance: 1098
Referee: Denys Kutsyi (Ukraine)

Futsal Club Semey won 8–6 on aggregate.

25 November 2025
18:00 (19:00 UTC+2)

| FC HIT (Ukraine) | 2–2 | (Spain) Palma Futsal |
|---|---|---|
| Podliuk 9'43"; Cherniavskyi 15'19" | Report | Charuto 5'27"; Fabinho 36'21" (pen.) |

Pálffy István Rendezvénycsarnok, Berettyóújfalu (Hungary)
Attendance: 469
Referee: Nikola Jelić (Croatia)
5 December 2025
19:30

| Palma Futsal (Spain) | 4–2 | (Ukraine) FC HIT |
|---|---|---|
| Rivillos 7'39", 23'37"; Alisson 34'51"; Ernesto 35'23" | Report | Zhuk 29'24", 37'15" |

Palau Municipal d'Esports Son Moix, Palma de Mallorca
Attendance: 3414
Referee: Vlad Nicolae Ciobanu (Romania)

Palma Futsal won 6–4 on aggregate.

24 November 2025
20:15

| FC Prishtina 01 (Kosovo) | 3–3 | (Latvia) Riga FC |
|---|---|---|
| Maxharraj 5'20", 9'44"; Alaj 33'17" | Report | Kuļepovs 18'21"; Daniel Airoso 31'15"; Jose Marquardt 37'07" |

Pallati i Rinise, Pristina
Attendance: 1538
Referee: Damian Grabowski (Poland), Slawomir Steczko (Poland)
5 December 2025
18:30 (19:30 UTC+2)

| Riga FC (Latvia) | 8–1 | (Kosovo) FC Prishtina 01 |
|---|---|---|
| Claudino 1'14", 7'15"; Daniel Airoso 9'04", 11'54"; Fradick Goes 17'43"; Mickēvičs 28'57"; Vargas 36'18"; Rimkus 39'53" | Report | Kameri 32'46" |

Latvian Team Sports Hall, Riga
Attendance: 864
Referee: Lars van Leeuwen (The Netherlands), Ibrahim El Jilali (The Netherlands)

Riga FC won 11–4 on aggregate.

24 November 2025
17:00 (20:00 UTC+4)

| Araz (Azerbaijan) | 0–9 | (Portugal) Benfica |
|---|---|---|
| | Report | Silva 11'43", 31'28"; Arthur 13'25", 21'49", 35'17"; Kutchy 14'16"; Higor de Souza 16'39", 38'58"; Jacaré 29'20" |

Baku Sports Palace, Baku
Attendance: 678
Referee: Yiangos Yiangou (Cyprus)
5 December 2025
18:30 (17:30 UTC+0)

| Benfica (Portugal) | 4–2 | (Azerbaijan) Araz |
|---|---|---|
| Higor de Souza 9'24"; André Coelho 28'57"; Silva 34'28", 35'40" | Report | Luiggi Longo 35'52"; Alakbarov 39'40" |

Pavilhão Fidelidade, Lisbon
Attendance: 916
Referee: Petar Radojcic (Serbia)

Benfica won 13–2 on aggregate.

24 November 2025
20:00 (21:00 UTC+2)

| AEK Futsal (Greece) | 0–11 | (Portugal) Sporting CP |
|---|---|---|
| | Report | Vinicius Rocha 5'50"; Merlim 11'02", 29'12"; Felipe Valério 11'49"; Diogo Santos 20'32", 31'12"; Zicky 27'43"; Tomás Paçó 28'42"; Guilherme 32'49"; Bruno Pinto 35'24", 37'06" |

OACA Kasimatis Hall, Athens
Attendance: 800
Referee: Norbert Szilágyi (Hungary)
4 December 2025
21:30 (20:30 UTC+0)

| Sporting CP (Portugal) | 8–3 | (Greece) AEK Futsal |
|---|---|---|
| Bruno Pinto 0'19", 1'51", 30'24"; Guilherme 2'48"; Pauleta 24'21", 37'12"; Tomás Paçó 34'14"; Felipe Valério 34'46" | Report | Ntatis 12'21"; Vitinho 23'02"; Felipinho 34'59" |

Pavilhão João Rocha, Lisbon
Attendance: 846
Referee: Daniel Matkovic (Switzerland)

Sporting CP won 19–3 on aggregate.

24 November 2025
20:00

| Anderlecht (Belgium) | 3–7 | (Kazakhstan) Kairat |
|---|---|---|
| Rangel 2'10"; Gréllo 2'52"; Eric Panes 9'34" | Report | Caio Ruiz 1'25"; Athirson Silva 10'33", 25'04"; Otanha 11'05", 39'30"; Tursagulov 20'07"; Orazov 28'18" |

Belleheide, Roosdaal
Attendance: 1000
Referee: Arttu Kyynäräinen (Finland)
5 December 2025
16:00 (20:00 UTC+5)

| Kairat (Kazakhstan) | 5–3 | (Belgium) Anderlecht |
|---|---|---|
| Rashit 6'30"; Orazov 22'10", 32'13"; Joao Paulo 36'07"; Athirson Silva 39'47" | Report | Edu 14'36"; Gréllo 17'56" (pen.); Dillien 39'23" (pen.) |

Baluan Sholak Sports Palace, Almaty
Attendance: 2200
Referee: Juan José Cordero Gallardo (Spain)

Kairat won 12–6 on aggregate.

24 November 2025
19:00

| Luxol St Andrews (Malta) | 1–9 | (Spain) Jimbee Cartagena |
|---|---|---|
| Vitinho 37'03" | Report | Francisco Cortés 0'26"; Darío Gil 3'55"; Osamanmusa 8'15", 24'36"; Pablo Ramirez 9'27"; Mellado 11'43"; Gon Castejón 14'38"; Juninho 19'39"; Waltinho 36'05" (pen.) |

Tal-Qroqq University Sports Hall, Gżira
Attendance: 200
Referee: Julien Lang (France)
5 December 2025
20:30

| Jimbee Cartagena (Spain) | 5–1 | (Malta) Luxol St Andrews |
|---|---|---|
| Juninho 11'50"; Vevé 22'39" (o.g.); Mellado 33'42"; Darío Gil 37'45"; Waltinho 39'31" | Report | Vitinho 18'39" |

Palacio de los deportes de Cartagena, Cartagena
Attendance: 2000
Referee: Jiri Bergs (Belgium)

Jimbee Cartagena won 14–2 on aggregate.

==== Quarter-finals ====
23 February 2026
20:30

| Étoile Lavalloise (France) | 5–4 | (Kazakhstan) Futsal Club Semey |
|---|---|---|
| B. Bakkali 8'18", 32'03", 38'45"; A. Mohammed 35'42"; El Mesrar 38'08" | Report | Bruno Gomes 0'39", 11'18"; Torres 2'44"; Pedrinho 23'53" |

Espace Mayenne, Laval
Attendance: 3,300
Referee: Alejandro Martínez Flores (Spain), Juan José Cordero Gallardo (Spain)
6 March 2026
16:00 (20:00 UTC+5)

| Futsal Club Semey (Kazakhstan) | 2–3 | (France) Étoile Lavalloise |
|---|---|---|
| Marcelo 1'41"; Gereykhanov 26'11" | Report | Guirio 31'40"; B. Bakkali 32'46", 39'05" |

Abay Arena, Semey
Attendance: 4,711
Referee: Rúben Santos (Portugal), Cristiano Santos (Portugal)

Étoile Lavalloise won 8–6 on aggregate.

22 February 2026
18:00

| Palma Futsal (Spain) | 7–4 | (Latvia) Riga FC |
|---|---|---|
| Fabinho 0'12"; David Peña 4'16"; Alisson 4'54", 6'03"; Mateus Maia 17'51"; Deivão 26'20"; Charuto 30'41" | Report | Claudino 28'23", 34'46"; Diego Roncaglio 29'59"; Fabinho 32'49" (o.g.) |

Palau Municipal d'Esports Son Moix, Palma de Mallorca
Attendance: 3,800
Referee: Damian Grabowski (Poland), Arttu Kyynäräinen (Finland)
6 March 2026
18:30 (19:30 UTC+2)

| Riga FC (Latvia) | 1–0 | (Spain) Palma Futsal |
|---|---|---|
| Deivão 39'27" (o.g.) | Report |

Latvian Team Sports Hall, Riga
Attendance: 823
Referee: Nicola Manzione (Italy), Chiara Perona (Italy)

Palma Futsal won 7–5 on aggregate.

23 February 2026
21:00 (20:00 UTC+0)

| Benfica (Portugal) | 4–3 | (Portugal) Sporting CP |
|---|---|---|
| Jacaré 18'41"; Arthur 30'14"; Raúl Moreira 32'59"; Diego Nunes 39'59" | Report | Bruno Pinto 14'23"; Merlim 27'13"; Zicky 30'53" |

Pavilhão Fidelidade, Lisbon
Attendance: 2,400
Referee: Dejan Veselič (Slovenia), Aleš Močnik Perič (Slovenia)
6 March 2026
21:00 (20:00 UTC+0)

| Sporting CP (Portugal) | 7–4 | (Portugal) Benfica |
|---|---|---|
| Bernardo Paçó 0'55"; Bruno Pinto 3'00" (pen.), 29'49"; Wesley França 4;02"; Tomás Paçó 5'32", 22'20"; Diogo Santos 28'45" | Report | Silvestre Ferreira 12'23"; Arthur 15'51"; André Coelho 20'23"; Peléh 25'12" |

Pavilhão João Rocha, Lisbon
Attendance: 2,663
Referee: Nikola Jelić (Croatia), Dino Kramar (Croatia)

Sporting CP won 10–8 on aggregate.

23 February 2026
16:00 (20:00 UTC+5)

| Kairat (Kazakhstan) | 1–2 | (Spain) Jimbee Cartagena |
|---|---|---|
| Tomaz Braga 20'09" (o.g.) | Report | Darío Gil 24'50"; Juninho 25'00" |

Baluan Sholak Sports Palace, Almaty
Attendance: 2,823
Referee: Viktor Bugenko (Moldova), Grigori Ošomkov (Estonia)
6 March 2026
20:30

| Jimbee Cartagena (Spain) | 7–4 | (Kazakhstan) Kairat |
|---|---|---|
| Pablo Ramirez 3'21", 9'33"; Motta 6'06", 37'22"; Osamanmusa 22'22"; Waltinho 26'48", 39'59" | Report | Tursagulov 20'53", 38'58"; Edson 27'06"; Hugo Neves 37'33" |

Palacio de los deportes de Cartagena, Cartagena
Attendance: 4,817
Referee: Ondřej Černý (Czech Republic), Daniel Matković (Switzerland)

Jimbee Cartagena won 9–5 on aggregate.

=== Final tournament ===
==== Semi-finals ====
8 May 2026
17:30 (16:30 WEST)

| Jimbee Cartagena (Spain) | 3–3 (a.e.t.) | (Portugal) Sporting CP |
|---|---|---|
| Waltinho 11'23"; Francisco Cortés 17'46"; Gon Castejón 43'48" | Report | Zicky 21'20"; Felipe Valério 24'15"; Tomás Paçó 43'00" |
Penalties
| Waltinho (penalty scored); Darío Gil (penalty scored); Pablo Ramirez (penalty scored); Tomaz Braga (penalty scored); Juninho (penalty scored); Osamanmusa (penalty missed) | 5–6 | (penalty scored) Bruno Pinto; (penalty scored) Vinicius Rocha; (penalty scored) Tomás Paçó; (penalty scored) Diogo Santos; (penalty scored) Merlim; (penalty scored) Felipe Valério |

Vitrifrigo Arena, Pesaro
Attendance: 2,402
Referee: Dejan Veselič (Slovenia), Damian Grabowski (Poland)

8 May 2026
20:30 (19:30 WEST)

| Palma Futsal (Spain) | 6–6 (a.e.t.) | (France) Étoile Lavalloise |
|---|---|---|
| Charuto 9'35"; Fabinho 19'45", 31'36", 35'38" (pen.); Machado 20'35"; Deivão 24'44" | Report | Guirio 5'10", 14'36", 16'14"; Lutin 5'51"; B. Bakkali 13'25"; Mouhoudine 18'51" |
Penalties
| Fabinho (penalty scored); Ernesto (penalty scored); Alisson (penalty scored); Lin (penalty scored); Piqueras (penalty scored) | 5–4 | (penalty scored) Mouhoudine; (penalty scored) A. Mohammed; (penalty scored) Lutin; (penalty scored) B. Bakkali; (penalty missed) Guirio |

Vitrifrigo Arena, Pesaro
Attendance: 2,957
Referee: Nicola Manzione (Italy), Peter Nurse (England)

==== Third place match ====
10 May 2026
15:00 (14:00 WEST)

| Jimbee Cartagena (Spain) | 3–3 | (France) Étoile Lavalloise |
|---|---|---|
| Osamanmusa 7'55"; Pablo Ramirez 11'04"; Gon Castejón 33'54" | Report | A. Mohammed 15'12"; Mouhoudine 17'02" (pen.); B. Bakkali 27'18" |
Penalties
| Waltinho (penalty scored); Tomaz Braga (penalty scored); Pablo Ramirez (penalty scored); Mellado (penalty scored); Juninho (penalty scored) | 5–4 | (penalty scored) Mouhoudine; (penalty scored) A. Mohammed; (penalty missed) Lutin; (penalty scored) Megrous; (penalty scored) B. Bakkali |

Vitrifrigo Arena, Pesaro
Attendance: 3,430
Referee: Arttu Kyynäräinen (Finland), Dominykas Norkus (Lithuania)

==== Final ====
10 May 2026
18:00 (17:00 WEST)

| Sporting CP (Portugal) | 2–0 | (Spain) Palma Futsal |
|---|---|---|
| Diogo Santos 3'20"; Alisson 35'51" (o.g.) | Report |

Vitrifrigo Arena, Pesaro
Attendance: 5,816
Referee: Nikola Jelić (Croatia), Ondřej Černý (Czech Republic)
