= Marokhy Ndione =

Swedish footballer (born 1999)

Personal information
- Date of birth: 4 November 1999 (age 27)
- Place of birth: Dakar, Senegal
- Height: 1.92 m (6 ft 4 in)
- Position: Forward

Team information
- Current team: Jönköpings Södra IF
- Number: 22

Youth career
- Borås AIK
- –2014: Elfsborg
- 2015: Borås AIK
- 2016–2019: Elfsborg

Senior career*
Years	Team	Apps	(Gls)
2015	Borås AIK	7	(4)
2019–2021	Elfsborg	59	(7)
2020	→ Örgryte (loan)	5	(1)
2022–2024	Viborg	7	(0)
2023	→ Feirense (loan)	5	(1)
2024–2025	FC U Craiova	1	(0)
2025	AC Oulu	7	(2)
2026-	Jönköpings Södra IF	1	(0)

International career
2017	Sweden U18	1	(1)
- * Club domestic league appearances and goals as of 16 November 2026

Marokhy Ndione (born 4 November 1999) is a Swedish professional footballer who plays as a forward for Söderettan club Jönköpings Södra IF.

== Club career ==
=== IF Elsborg ===
Ndione came to Sweden at a young age. He started his career at Borås AIK and later joined IF Elfsborg, but had to leave the club at the age of 15 because he was not good enough. He returned to his childhood club, Borås AIK, and after one season, where he scored four goals in seven games in Division 3 for Borås' first team, Ndione returned to IF Elfsborg. After being acclaimed top scorer in the U-17 (23 goals) and U-19 (21 goals) leagues in Sweden in 2016 and 2017, Ndione signed a three-year contract in January 2018 with Elfsborg and was promoted to the senior squad.

In his first season in the senior team, he didn't get any playing time. He made his official debut on 23 February 2019. With 20 minutes left in the Swedish Cup game against IK Frej, Ndione came on from the bench and made his debut. About a month and a half later, he also got his Allsvenskan debut against Hammarby IF on 1 April 2019.

In February 2020, Ndione extended his Elfsborg contract by three years. On 3 September 2020, Ndione was loaned out to Superettan club Örgryte IS in a cooperation agreement, allowing him to represent both clubs in the autumn of 2020.

Returning to Elfsborg for the 2021 season, he made 22 appearances in Allsvenskan and scored five goals.

=== Viborg FF ===
On 14 January 2022, Ndione joined Danish Superliga club Viborg FF on a deal until June 2025.

On 1 August 2023, Viborg announced that Ndione had been sent on loan to Liga Portugal 2 side Feirense. After the loan spell, Ndione was not involved in the pre-season in Viborg, as the club had announced that the player was not part of the plans and was exploring the possibilities of finding a new club.

On 16 July 2024, Viborg confirmed that they had terminated the agreement with Ndione. Ndione made just 10 appearances for Viborg, scoring one goal and assisting in two others, before his departure.

=== FC U Craiova ===
On 6 September 2024, Ndione joined Romanian Liga II club FC U Craiova on a three-year contract.

=== AC Oulu ===
On 4 February 2025, after a trial with KuPS, Marokhy signed with Finnish Veikkausliiga club AC Oulu for the 2025 season. On 5 April, Ndione scored in his Veikkausliiga debut, in a 4–3 away loss against VPS.

=== Jönköpings Södra IF ===
On 4 August 2026 Ndione went back to Sweden, with third-division side Jönköpings Södra IF.

== Personal life ==
Ndione was born in Senegal and raised in Sweden.

== Career statistics ==
As of 2 May 2025

Appearances and goals by club, season and competition
Club	Season	League			National cup (Note: Includes Suomen Cup)		League cup (Note: Includes Finnish League Cup)		Europe		Total	
Club	Season	Division	Apps	Goals	Apps	Goals	Apps	Goals	Apps	Goals	Apps	Goals
Borås AIK	2015	Swedish Division 3	7	4	–		–		–		7	4
Elfsborg	2019	Allsvenskan	8	1	6	1	–		–		14	2
Elfsborg	2020	Allsvenskan	19	0	4	1	–		–		23	1
Elfsborg	2021	Allsvenskan	22	5	0	0	–		6 (Note: Appearances in UEFA Conference League)	4	28	9
Elfsborg	Total		49	6	10	2	0	0	6	4	65	12
Örgryte IS (loan)	2020	Superettan	5	1	–		–		–		5	1
Viborg	2021–22	Danish Superliga	2	0	0	0	–		–		2	0
Viborg	2022–23	Danish Superliga	5	0	0	0	–		3	1	8	1
Viborg	2023–24	Danish Superliga	0	0	0	0	–		–		0	0
Viborg	Total		7	0	0	0	0	0	3	1	10	1
Feirense (loan)	2023–24	Liga Portugal 2	5	1	–		–		–		5	1
FC U Craiova	2024–25	Liga II	1	0	0	0	–		–		1	0
KuPS	2025	Veikkausliiga	0	0	0	0	1	1	0	0	1	1
AC Oulu	2025	Veikkausliiga	6	2	0	0	2	2	–		8	4
Career total			80	14	10	2	3	3	9	5	102	24
