= Montenegrin Futsal First League =

- Founded: 2006; 20 years ago
- Country: Montenegro
- Confederation: UEFA
- Number of clubs: 10
- Level on pyramid: 1
- International cup: UEFA Futsal Cup
- Current champions: KMF Titograd (2019–20)
- Most championships: KMF Titograd (3 titles)
- Website: fscg.me

Prva Crnogorska futsal Liga is the highest-ranked futsal league in Montenegro. It is governed by the Football Association of Montenegro and it is played under UEFA and FIFA rules. It was founded in 2006 and as of 2019–20 season, the league consists of 10 teams.

== History ==
First official futsal competition in Montenegro was organized in January 1988, as a Republic qualifiers for the final SFR Yugoslavia tournament. Most successful teams at that time were Ratar and Transport from Podgorica, who represented Montenegro in the finals.
Era of significant successes started at nineties, as teams from Montenegro made big progress in futsal championship of FR Yugoslavia. On season 1993–94, Premijer (Nikšić) won the national title, and that was the very first championship won by one squad from Montenegro. Next year, Premijer was a runner-up of Yugoslav championship. On season 1995–96, another team from Nikšić became Yugoslav champion - Elektroprivreda and next year they finished second. Next big achievement of Montenegrin futsal teams came on season 2000–01. In the national finals played two teams from Montenegro, and the title won CD Shop Mocart (Danilovgrad), who won two games against Nikšić (7-2; 8-4). With that result, CD Shop Mocart became first Montenegrin side who participated in UEFA Futsal Champions League. Next time, CD Shop Mocart became a champion of Serbia and Montenegro on season 2002–03, after two victories in the final against Balestra Nikšić (2:1; 7:3). On season 2004-05, Municipium (Pljevlja) participated in Yugoslav championship finals, but they were defeated against Marbo Belgrade (2-1; 3-10).
In 2006, after the Independence referendum, Montenegro split from Serbia. Following that, Montenegrin Futsal League is founded as top-tier national competition. During the first two seasons, in competition dominated Municipium, while the title on season 2008–09 surprisingly won Montenegrostars (Budva). Next year, the title winner was CD Shop Mocart and on season 2010–11 Bajo Pivljanin (Plužine). Next two years, the title-holder was Jedinstvo (Bijelo Polje), whose domination was finished on season 2013–14, finished with the first title for Agama (Podgorica). Next year, another Podgorica side won the title - Titograd. Title for season 2015–16 won Military Futsal Team (Danilovgrad), and Titograd won their second title on season 2016–17. Next season, first title in history won Čelik (Nikšić). Record of the time made Titograd who won their third national title on season 2018–19.

== Champions ==
=== Champions by season ===
Since its inception in 2006–07 season, nine different clubs have won the title of Montenegrin Futsal League champion. Titograd is the only team who won three titles. Including the trophies from Yugoslav era, another team which won three titles is CD Shop Mocart.
Two other teams, Municipium and Jedinstvo, won two titles - both twice in a row.

Season	Champion	Runner-up	Third	Playoffs final
2006–07	Municipium	Piramida	Ozrinići	Municipium - Piramida 3-1; 2-2
2007–08	Municipium	Piramida	Nikšić	Municipium - Piramida 6-1; 2-1
2008–09	Montenegrostars	Piramida	Nikšić	Only League stage
2009–10	CD Shop Mocart	Piramida	Nikšić	CD Shop Mocart - Piramida 5-2, 3-5
2010–11	Bajo Pivljanin	Studentski Dom	Nikšić	Only League stage
2011–12	Jedinstvo	Bajo Pivljanin	Studentski Dom	Jedinstvo - Bajo Pivljanin 4-0, 4-4
2012–13	Jedinstvo	Studentski Dom	Bajo Pivljanin	Jedinstvo - Studentski Dom 4-1, 2-1
2013–14	Agama	Titograd	Studentski Dom	Agama - Titograd 4-0, 4-4
2014–15	Titograd	Agama	Nikšić	Titograd - Agama 6-2; 6-1
2015–16	Military Futsal Team	Nikšić	Titograd	Military Futsal Team - Nikšić 5-3; 2-2
2016–17	Titograd	Agama	Bajo Pivljanin	Titograd - Agama 3-1; 9-8
2017–18	Čelik	Brskovo	Jedinstvo	Čelik - Brskovo 3-2; 4-4
2018–19	Titograd	Cezar	Brskovo	Titograd - Cezar 8-3
2019–20	Titograd	Brskovo	Studentski Dom	Only League stage
2020–21	Titograd	Bajo Pivljanin	Studentski Dom	Only League stage
2021–22	Titograd	Brskovo	Bajo Pivljanin	Titograd - Brskovo 7-2, 2-3
2022–23	Titograd	Ulcinj	Dolcinium	Titograd - Ulcinj 5-5, 7-4
2023–24	Titograd	Bajo Pivljanin	Ulcinj	Titograd - Bajo Pivljanin 2-1, 4-2, 6-3

=== Titles by Club ===
==== Montenegrin Futsal First League ====
Below is a list of clubs with titles won in Montenegrin Futsal League.

Club	Town	Champion	Runner-up	Years won
Titograd	Podgorica	8	1	2014–15, 2016–17, 2018–19, 2019-20, 2020-21, 2021-22, 2022-23, 2023-24
Municipium	Pljevlja	2	0	2006–07, 2007–08
Jedinstvo	Bijelo Polje	2	0	2011–12, 2012–13
Čelik	Nikšić	1	0	2017–18
Montenegrostars	Budva	1	0	2008–09
CD Shop Mocart	Danilovgrad	1	0	2009–10
Agama	Podgorica	1	1	2013–14
Bajo Pivljanin	Plužine	1	1	2010–11
Military Futsal Team	Danilovgrad	1	0	2015–16

==== Overall ====
Below is an overall list, with titles won in both leagues - Montenegrin Futsal League and FR Yugoslavia / Serbia and Montenegro Championship.

Club	Town	Champion	Runner-up	Years won
Titograd	Podgorica	8	1	2014–15, 2016–17, 2018–19, 2019-20, 2020-21, 2021-22, 2022-23, 2023-24
CD Shop Mocart	Danilovgrad	3	0	2000–01, 2002–03, 2009–10
Municipium	Pljevlja	2	1	2006–07, 2007–08
Jedinstvo	Bijelo Polje	2	0	2011–12, 2012–13
Čelik	Nikšić	1	0	2017–18
Premijer	Nikšić	1	1	1993–94
Elektroprivreda	Nikšić	1	1	1995–96
Montenegrostars	Budva	1	0	2008–09
Bajo Pivljanin	Plužine	1	1	2010–11
Agama	Podgorica	1	1	2013–14
Military Futsal Team	Danilovgrad	1	0	2015–16

=== Top scorers ===
Season	Top scorer(s)	Club	Goals
2015-16	(Montenegro) Dragan Jakovljević	Cezar	43
2016-17	(Montenegro) Ranko Novović	Mirabile Moda	20
2017-18	(Montenegro) Mileta Vučetić	Brskovo	29
2018-19	(Montenegro) Dragan Jakovljević	Cezar	31

== Participants and records ==
=== All-time participants (2006-) ===
Since foundation, in Montenegrin Futsal First League participated 25 different clubs. Below is a list of participants with number of seasons in the First League.

Club	Town	Ssn	First	Last
Bajo Pivljanin	Plužine	13	2006-07	2018-19
Studentski Dom	Podgorica	12	2006-07	2018-19
Nikšić	Nikšić	9	2007-08	2018-19
Gorštak	Kolašin	9	2007-08	2018-19
Jedinstvo	Bijelo Polje	8	2011-12	2018-19
Cattaro	Kotor	8	2006-07	2015-16
Titograd	Podgorica	7	2012-13	2018-19
Mirabile Moda	Podgorica	7	2012-13	2018-19
Cezar	Budva	6	2013-14	2018-19
Military Futsal Team	Danilovgrad	5	2014-15	2018-19
CD Shop Mocart	Danilovgrad	4	2006-07	2009-10
Piramida	Nikšić	4	2006-07	2009-10
Agama	Podgorica	4	2013-14	2016-17
Teuta	Ulcinj	3	2006-07	2008-09
Municipium	Pljevlja	2	2006-07	2007-08
Pljevlja	Pljevlja	2	2006-07	2007-08
Brskovo	Mojkovac	2	2017-18	2018-19
Berane	Berane	2	2017-18	2018-19
Čelik	Nikšić	2	2017-18	2018-19
Boss	Podgorica	2	2012-13	2013-14
Montenegrostars	Budva	1	2008-09	2008-09
Ekonomist	Nikšić	1	2006-07	2006-07
Tivat	Tivat	1	2015-16	2015-16
Ozrinići	Nikšić	1	2006-07	2006-07
Danilovgrad	Danilovgrad	1	2008-09	2008-09

=== Records ===
- Biggest league victory/defeat: 14–0, Cattaro vs. BOSS, (season 2013-14)
- Longest unbeaten run: 27 matches, Municipium, 14.10.2006 - 10.11.2007
- Longest winning streak: 19 matches, Municipium, 25.11.2006 - 10.11.2007
- Longest run without win: 28 matches, BOSS, 07.10.2012 - 18.05.2014
- Longest losing streak: 23 matches, BOSS, 17.11.2012 - 18.05.2014
- Highest number of scored goals by season: 134, Military Futsal Team, season 2015–16
- Highest number of conceded goals by season: 141, Cattaro, season 2015–16

== Current season ==
On season 2019-20, ten squads are playing in Montenegrin Futsal First League. After the 18 weeks of regular season, four best placed teams will qualify for the playoffs.
Below is the list of members of Montenegrin Futsal First League 2019-20.

Club	City	Home ground
Bajo Pivljanin	Plužine	Nikšić Sports Center (3,000)
Brskovo	Mojkovac	Vuksan Đukić SC (1,500)
Cattaro	Kotor	Radanovići SC (500)
Gorštak	Kolašin	Kolašin Sports Center (1,500)
Jedinstvo	Bijelo Polje	Nikoljac SC (2,500)
Military Futsal Team	Danilovgrad	Police Academy Hall (700)
Mirabile Moda	Podgorica	Verde SC (2,100)
Nikšić	Nikšić	Nikšić Sports Center (3,000)
Studentski Dom	Podgorica	Verde SC (2,100)
Titograd	Podgorica	Verde SC (2,100)

== See also ==
- Montenegro national futsal team
- Montenegrin First League
- Football Association of Montenegro
- Football in Montenegro
