= Športni park =

Športni park (English: Sports Park) is a name for many stadiums in Slovenia. It can refer to:

- Domžale Sports Park
- Nova Gorica Sports Park
- Lendava Sports Park
- Kodeljevo Sports Park
- Kidričevo Sports Park
- Šiška Sports Park
