= Kyiv Futsal =

Ukrainian futsal club

- Full name: Kyiv Futsal
- Ground: Kyiv, Ukraine
- Manager: Taras Shpychka
- League: Ukrainian Futsal Championship

Kyiv Futsal is a Ukrainian futsal club based in Kyiv. The club competes in the Ukrainian Futsal Championship and has represented Ukraine in the UEFA Futsal Champions League.

== History ==
The club gained wider recognition after qualifying for the 2025–26 UEFA Futsal Champions League.

== Management ==
- Head coach: Taras Shpychka

== See also ==
- Ukrainian Futsal Championship
- UEFA Futsal Champions League
