= Boldklubberne Glostrup Albertslund =

Danish football club

BGA
- Full name: Boldklubberne Glostrup Albertslund
- Short name: BGA
- Founded: 2009
- Dissolved: 2015
- Ground: Glostrup Idrætspark, Glostrup
- Capacity: 4,000
- Manager: Jan Bjur
- League: Danish 2 Division
- 2014–15: Zealand Series, 4th
Home colours	Away colours

Boldklubberne Glostrup Albertslund (BGA) was a Danish football club currently playing in the Zealand Series. They play at Glostrup Idrætspark in Glostrup, Metropolitan Copenhagen, which has a capacity of 4,000.

It was a merger of Glostrup FK and Albertslund IF. The merger was dissolved in 2015.

The club won the Danish Futsal Championship twice; in 2010 and in 2011. They also won a silver medal in 2012.
