= Danish Futsal Championship =

- Founded: 2007
- Country: Denmark
- Confederation: UEFA
- Level on pyramid: 1
- International cup: UEFA Futsal Cup
- Current champions: Hjørring Futsal Klub; Allerød FK
- Most championships: JB Futsal; Fortuna Hjørring
- Current: Current Season at UEFA.com

The Danish Futsal Championship is the premier futsal championship in Denmark. Organized by Danish Football Association.

== Champions ==
=== Men's ===
Season	Winner
2007/2008	Albertslund IF
2008/2009	Albertslund IF
2009/2010	BGA
2010/2011	BGA
2011/2012	Sport Italia
2012/2013	JB Futsal
2013/2014	København Futsal
2014/2015	JB Futsal
2015/2016	JB Futsal
2016/2017	København Futsal
2017/2018	JB Futsal
2018/2019	JB Futsal
2019/2020	JB Futsal
2020/2021	JB Futsal
2021/2022	JB Futsal
2022/2023	JB Futsal
2023/2024	Hjørring Futsal Klub
2024/2025	Hjørring Futsal Klub
2025/2026	Hjørring Futsal Klub

=== Women's ===
Year	Gold	Silver	Bronze	Location
2008	Fortuna Hjørring	IK Skovbakken	OB	Kalundborg
2009	OB	Kolding BK	Skovlunde IF	Helsinge
2010	Team Viborg	KoldingQ	FC Damsø	Kolding
2011	IK Skovbakken	KoldingQ	Taastrup FC	København
2012	IK Skovbakken	Taastrup FC	KoldingQ	Vejen
2013	Fortuna Hjørring	Taastrup FC	IK Skovbakken	Valby
2014	Fortuna Hjørring	B1913	B93/HIK/Skjold	Nørresundby
2015	IK Skovbakken	Fortuna Hjørring	FA København	Assens
2016	Fortuna Hjørring	Skovbakken IK	Sundby BL	Aalborg
2017	Fortuna Hjørring	BSF	Næsby	Ringkøbing
2018	Fortuna Hjørring	IF Skjold Birkerød	IF Lyseng	Maribo
2019	Roskilde Pigefodbold	USG Q	IF Lyseng	Otterup
2020	Solrød FC	FC Damsø	IF Lyseng	Holbæk
2021	Cancelled			
2022	København Futsal	FC Damsø	Viborg Q	Sønderborg
2023	Køge BK	København Futsal	Team Viborg	Otterup
2024	Allerød FK	København Futsal	Viborg Q	
2025	Allerød FK	Viborg Q		
