= Ayoub Boukhari =

Dutch footballer

Personal information
- Date of birth: 6 May 1997 (age 29)
- Place of birth: Rotterdam, Netherlands
- Height: 1.70 m (5 ft 7 in)
- Position: Midfielder

Team information
- Current team: Tigers Roermond (futsal)
- Number: 17

Youth career
- Feyenoord
- RKSV Leonidas
- –2016: Excelsior

Senior career*
Years	Team	Apps	(Gls)
2016	Noordwijk		
2017–	Jong Sparta	62	(17)
2018–2019	Sparta	1	(0)
2020–2023	RKAVV		

International career
2022-	Netherlands (futsal)	39	(9)
- * Club domestic league appearances and goals as of 11:53, 4 September 2019 (UTC)

Ayoub Boukhari (born 6 May 1997) is a Dutch football player of Moroccan descent.

== Club career ==
He made his Eerste Divisie debut for Sparta Rotterdam on 30 November 2018 in a game against Helmond Sport as a 78th-minute substitute for Gregor Breinburg. He joined amateur side RKAVV in 2020.

He also is a Dutch international futsal player, scoring 19 goals in 39 games for the national team as of May 2026.

== Personal life ==
His brother Nourdin played professionally for Sparta and Ajax.
