= PalaCatania =

Indoor sports arena in Catania, Italy

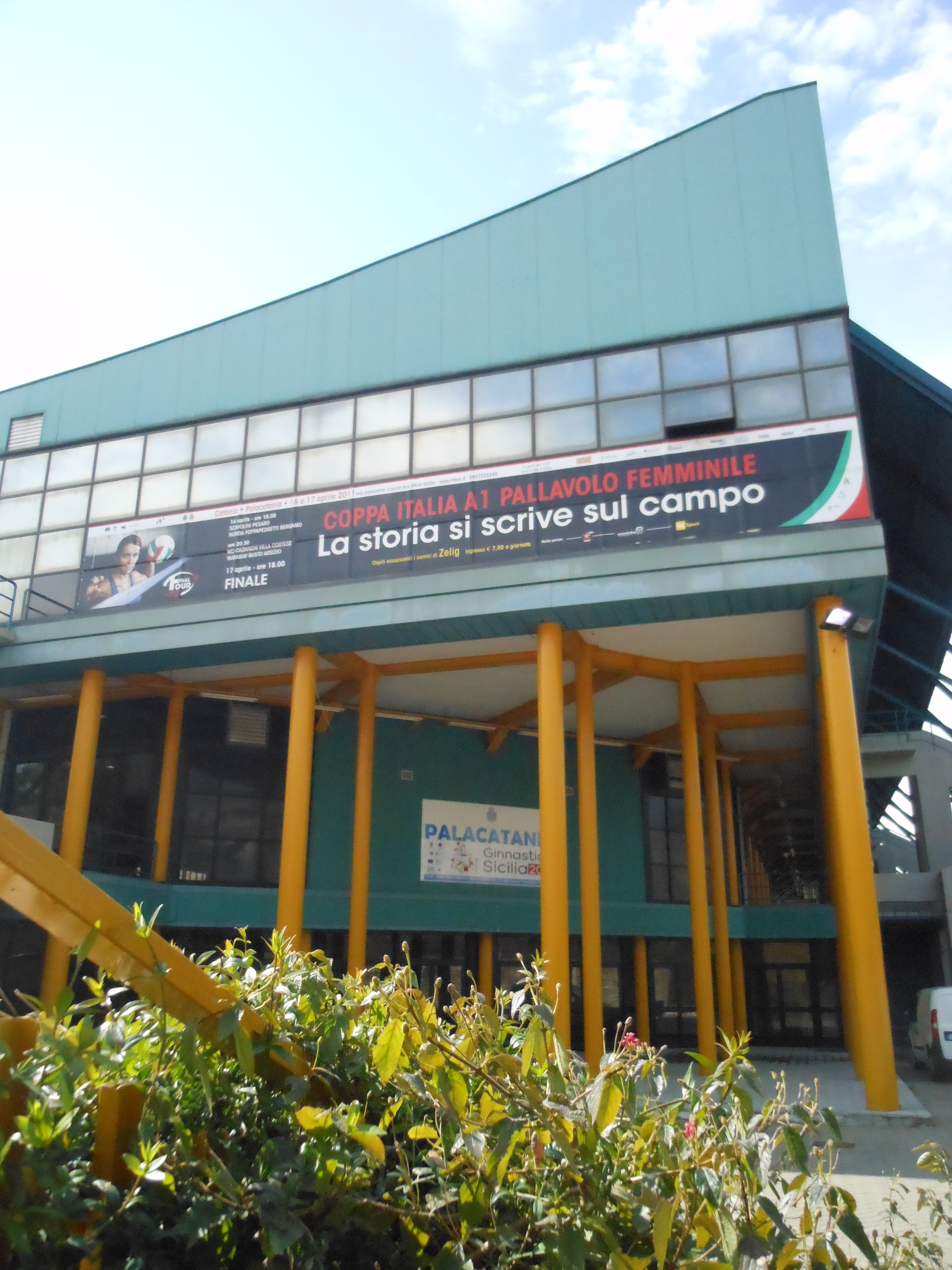
- PalaCatania sport arena
- Interactive map of PalaCatania
- Location: Catania, Italy
- Coordinates: 37.503194°N 15.056083°E
- Capacity: 5,000

Construction
- Opened: 1995

PalaCatania is an indoor sports arena, located in Catania, Italy. The capacity of the arena is 5,000 spectators.

It has hosted some matches of the 2010 FIVB Volleyball Men's World Championship.
