= Boråshallen =

Sports hall in Borås, Sweden

Coordinates: 57.7169°N 12.9286°E

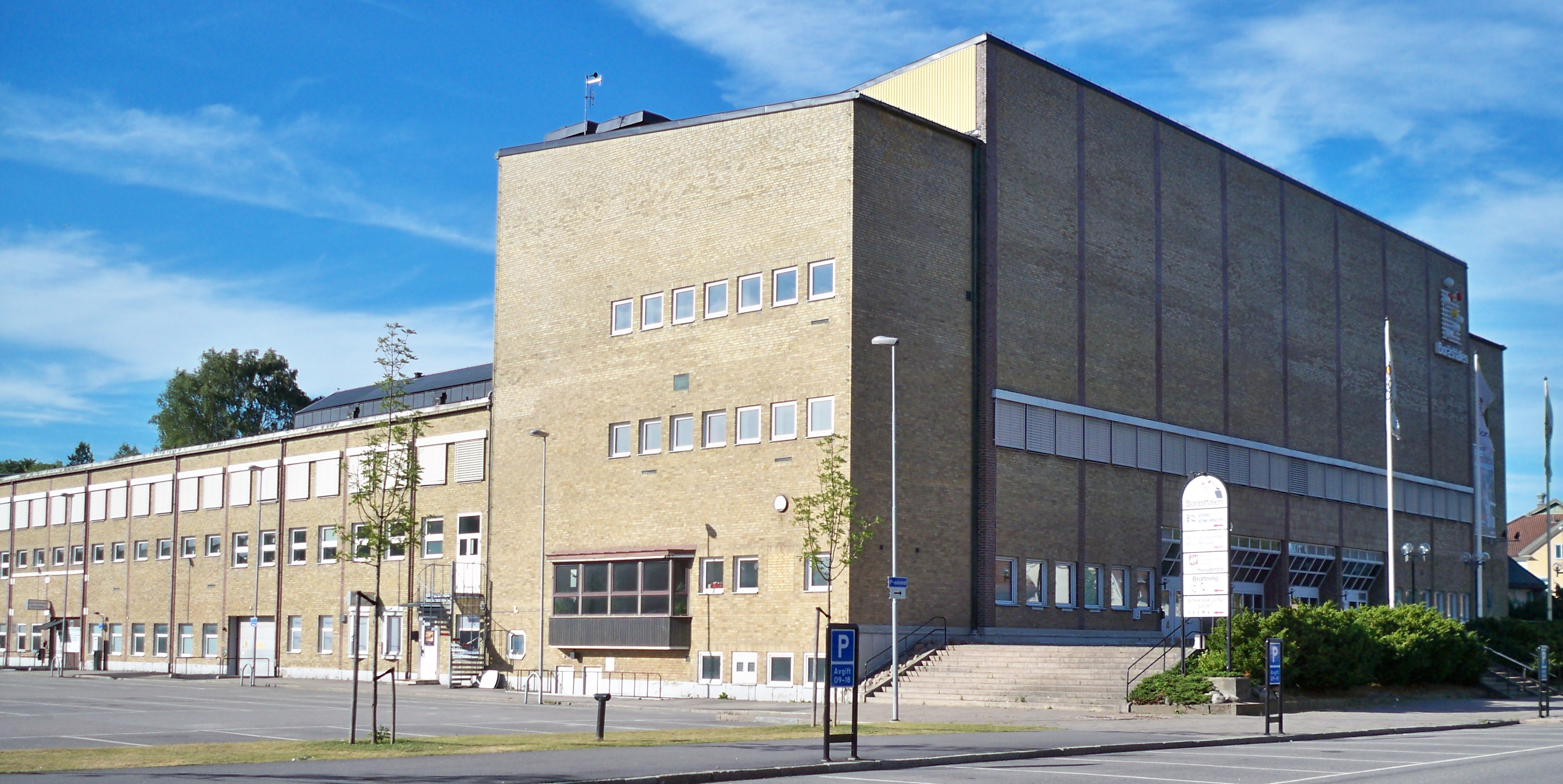
- Interactive map of Boråshallen
- Location: Bockasjögatan 2
- Capacity: 1950

Construction
- Opened: Mars 2, 1957
- Cost: 5 million kr

Tenant
- Borås Basket (Basketligan)

Boråshallen is a sports venue in Borås, Sweden. It's the main arena for indoor sports in Borås.

== Halls ==
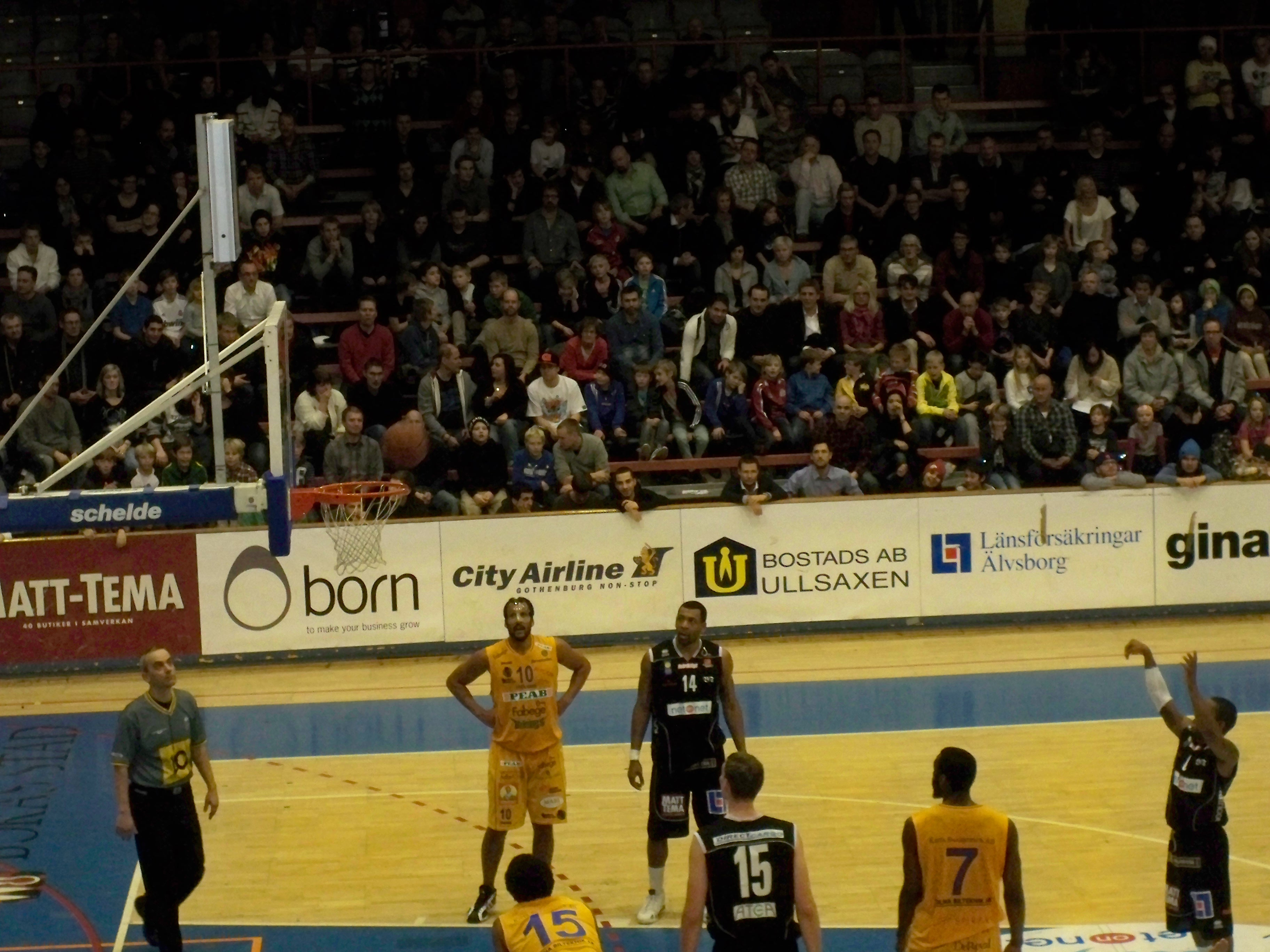
Borås Basket playing a match in hall A

The building has two big halls (A and B) and two smaller halls (C and D).

=== Concerts ===
The A hall has sometimes been used for concerts. On October 28, 1963, The Beatles held a concert in front of 2500 people.
