= KMF Bajo Pivljanin =

Futsal club based in Montenegro

Bajo Pivljanin
- Full name: KMF Bajo Pivljanin
- Ground: Sportski centar, Nikšić, Montenegro
- Chairman: Nikola Cicmil
- Manager: Milivoje Dondić
- League: Montenegrin Futsal League
- 2021/22: 4
Home colours

KMF Bajo Pivljanin is a futsal club based in Plužine, Montenegro.

== Honours ==
Montenegrin Futsal League:

- Champions 2010/11
- Vicechampions 2020/21

== UEFA Club Competitions Record ==
=== UEFA Futsal Cup ===
Season	Competition	Round	Country	Opponent	Result	Venue
2011/12	UEFA Futsal Cup	Main Round	(Scotland)	Perth Saltires	6–0	Perth
2011/12	UEFA Futsal Cup	Main Round	(Finland)	Ilves	2–4	Perth
2011/12	UEFA Futsal Cup	Main Round	(Germany)	Croatia Berlin	9–6	Perth

== See also ==
- Futsal in Montenegro
