= Borås AIK =

Swedish football club

- Full name: Borås Allmänna Idrottsklubb
- Founded: 1953
- Ground: Bodavallen; Borås; Sweden
- Chairman: Tommy Abrahamsson
- League: Division 5 Västergötland Södra
Home colours	Away colours

Borås AIK is a Swedish football club located in Borås.

== Background ==
Borås AIK currently plays in Division 5 Västergötland Mellersta which is the seventh tier of Swedish football. They play their home matches at the Bodavallen in Borås.

The club is affiliated to Västergötlands Fotbollförbund. Borås AIK played in the 2006 Svenska Cupen but lost 0–3 away to FK Jat in the first round.

== Season to season ==
In their most successful period Borås AIK competed in the following divisions:

Season	Level	Division	Section	Position	Movements
1970	Tier 4	Division 4	Västergötland Södra	3rd	
1971	Tier 4	Division 4	Västergötland Södra	1st	Promotion Playoffs – Promoted
1972	Tier 3	Division 3	Sydvästra Götaland	6th	
1973	Tier 3	Division 3	Sydvästra Götaland	8th	
1974	Tier 3	Division 3	Sydvästra Götaland	12th	Relegated
1975	Tier 4	Division 4	Västergötland Södra	5th	
1976	Tier 4	Division 4	Västergötland Södra	8th	

In recent seasons Borås AIK have competed in the following divisions:

Season	Level	Division	Section	Position	Movements
1999	Tier 5	Division 4	Västergötland Södra	6th	
2000	Tier 5	Division 4	Västergötland Södra	3rd	
2001	Tier 5	Division 4	Västergötland Södra	2nd	Promotion Playoffs
2002	Tier 5	Division 4	Västergötland Södra	5th	
2003	Tier 5	Division 4	Västergötland Södra	11th	Relegated
2004	Tier 6	Division 5	Västergötland Sydvästra	1st	Promoted
2005	Tier 5	Division 4	Västergötland Södra	8th	
2006*	Tier 6	Division 4	Västergötland Södra	9th	
2007	Tier 6	Division 4	Västergötland Södra	10th	Relegation Playoffs
2008	Tier 6	Division 4	Västergötland Södra	6th	
2009	Tier 6	Division 4	Västergötland Södra	9th	
2010	Tier 6	Division 4	Västergötland Södra	6th	
2011	Tier 6	Division 4	Västergötland Södra	4th	
2012	Tier 6	Division 4	Västergötland Södra	8th	
2013	Tier 6	Division 4	Västergötland Södra	2nd	Promotion Playoffs
2014	Tier 6	Division 4	Västergötland Södra	2nd	Promotion Playoffs - Promoted
2015	Tier 5	Division 3	Sydvästra Götaland	9th	Relegation Playoffs
2016	Tier 5	Division 3	Mellersta Götaland	9th	Relegation Playoffs - Relegated
2017	Tier 6	Division 4	Västergötland Södra	12th	Relegated
2018	Tier 7	Division 5	Västergötland Mellersta	5th	
2019	Tier 7	Division 5	Västergötland Södra	7th	

* League restructuring in 2006 resulted in a new division being created at Tier 3 and subsequent divisions dropping a level.
