= 2022–23 UEFA Futsal Champions League =

37th edition of top European men's futsal competition

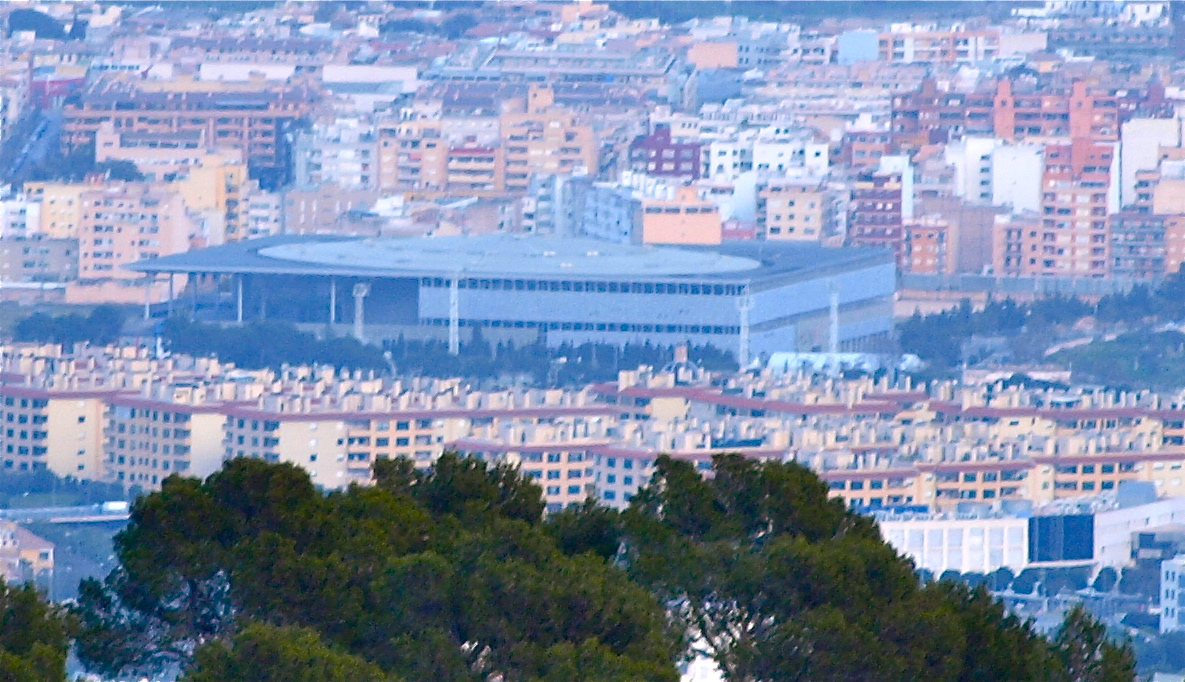
- The Palma Arena in Palma de Mallorca hosted the final.

Tournament details
- Dates: Qualifying rounds: 24 August 2022 – 26 November 2022; Final tournament: 5 – 7 May 2023
- Teams: Final tournament: 4 Total: 56 (from 52 associations)

Final positions
- Champions: (Spain) Palma Futsal (1st title)
- Runners-up: (Portugal) Sporting CP
- Third place: (Portugal) Benfica
- Fourth place: (Belgium) Anderlecht

Tournament statistics
- Matches played: 124
- Goals scored: 878 (7.08 per match)
- Top scorer(s): Season total: (Brazil) Vinicius Lazzaretti (11 goals); Final tournament: (Russia) Ivan Chishkala (3 goals)

The 2022–23 UEFA Futsal Champions League was the 37th edition of Europe's premier club futsal tournament, and the 22nd edition organized by UEFA. It was also the fifth edition since the tournament was rebranded from "UEFA Futsal Cup" to UEFA Futsal Champions League. The final tournament took place at the Palma Arena in Palma de Mallorca, Spain on 5–7 May 2023.

Debutants Palma Futsal defeated Sporting CP on penalties in the final to claim their first title in the competition and became the fifth club to win the title in their debut appearance. Benfica took bronze after beating Anderlecht, the first Belgian side to reach the last four since 2007. Barcelona were the defending champions, but were eliminated in the elite round.

== Association team allocation ==
A total of 56 teams from 52 of the 55 UEFA member associations participated in the 2022–23 UEFA Futsal Champions League. The association ranking based on the UEFA futsal national team coefficients was used to determine the number of participating teams for each association:

- The top three-ranked associations have two teams qualify.
- The winners of the 2021–22 UEFA Futsal Champions League qualify automatically and its association can also enter a second team. If the title-holders' association is among the top three-ranked associations, the 4th ranked association is also entitled to enter a second team.
- The remaining associations have one team qualify.

For this season, the top three-ranked associations are Portugal, Russia, and Spain. As the title holders are from Spain, the 4th ranked association, Kazakhstan, can enter two teams. After UEFA's decision to exclude Russian clubs from the 2022–23 UEFA competitions due to the 2022 Russian invasion of Ukraine, the right to enter a second team passed to the 5th ranked association, Croatia.

=== Association ranking ===
The UEFA futsal national team coefficients at the end of April 2022, used to determine the number of teams each association was entitled to enter, was as follows.

Association ranking for 2022–23 UEFA Champions League

Rank	Association	Coeff.	Teams
1	Portugal	2693.758	2
2	Russia	2547.159	0
3	Spain(TH)	2488.909	2
4	Kazakhstan	2367.187	2
5	Croatia	2051.042	2
6	Serbia	2050.143	1
7	Azerbaijan	2015.589	1
8	Ukraine	2009.816	1
9	Italy	1934.516	1
10	Czech Republic	1887.535	1
11	Georgia	1871.616	1
12	Finland	1854.372	1
13	Slovakia	1847.970	1
14	Slovenia	1841.333	1
15	Bosnia and Herzegovina	1837.207	1
16	Poland	1781.027	1
17	Romania	1738.151	1
18	Netherlands	1686.516	1
19	Belarus	1646.403	1

Rank	Association	Coeff.	Teams
20	Hungary	1637.232	1
21	France	1615.979	1
22	Belgium	1607.692	1
23	Latvia	1464.140	1
24	North Macedonia	1449.976	1
25	Moldova	1419.922	1
26	Montenegro	1321.596	1
27	Albania	1299.617	1
28	Kosovo	1264.428	1
29	Turkey	1257.736	1
30	Norway	1255.233	1
31	Denmark	1236.240	1
32	Sweden	1235.426	1
33	Armenia	1217.145	1
34	England	1204.183	1
35	Germany	1188.549	1
36	Greece	1155.396	1
37	Israel	1142.105	1

Rank	Association	Coeff.	Teams
38	Switzerland	1098.903	1
39	Cyprus	1085.011	1
40	Bulgaria	1063.645	1
41	Wales	1011.432	1
42	Lithuania	910.904	1
43	Andorra	910.044	1
44	San Marino	853.043	1
45	Estonia	849.940	1
46	Malta	837.308	1
47	Scotland	816.083	1
48	Gibraltar	780.661	1
49	Austria	728.018	1
50	Northern Ireland	724.015	1
NR	Iceland	—	1
NR	Luxembourg	—	1
NR	Republic of Ireland	—	1
NR	Faroe Islands	—	DNE
NR	Liechtenstein	—	DNE

Notes

- TH – Additional berth for title holders
- NR – No rank (association national team had been inactive on the previous 36 months)
- DNE – Did not enter

=== Distribution ===
For the 2022–23 UEFA Futsal Champions League, the clubs' entry round was determined by their UEFA futsal club coefficients, which took into account their performance from the previous three seasons.

Access list for 2022–23 UEFA Futsal Champions League
		Teams entering in this round	Teams advancing from previous round
Preliminary round (32 teams)		32 teams ranked 24–55	
Main round	Path A (16 teams)	Title holders; 15 teams ranked 1–11 and 16–19	
Main round	Path B (16 teams)	8 teams ranked 12–15 and 20–23	8 group winners from preliminary round
Elite round (16 teams)			4 group winners from main round path A; 4 group runners-up from main round path A; 4 group third-placed team from main round path A; 4 group winners from main round path B
Final tournament (4 teams)			4 group winners from elite round

=== Teams ===
Below are the participating teams of the 2022–23 UEFA Futsal Champions League (with their ranking among participating teams), grouped by their starting round and path for the main round.

Main round Path A
Team	Rank
(Spain) FC Barcelona	TH
(Portugal) Sporting CP	1
(Portugal) Benfica	2
(Spain) Palma Futsal	3
(Kazakhstan) Kairat	4
(Slovenia) Dobovec	5
(Ukraine) Prodexim Kherson	6
(Kazakhstan) Ayat	7
(Croatia) Novo Vrijeme	8
(Belgium) Anderlecht	9
(Netherlands) Hovocubo	10
(Hungary) Haladás	11
(Romania) United Galați	16
(Malta) Luxol St Andrews	17
(Croatia) Futsal Pula	18
(France) Sporting Paris	19

Main round Path B
Team	Rank
(Czech Republic) FK Chrudim	12
(Lithuania) Kauno Žalgiris	13
(Belarus) Stalitsa Minsk	14
(Bosnia and Herzegovina) Mostar SG	15
(Kosovo) Liqeni	20
(North Macedonia) Shkupi	21
(Azerbaijan) Araz Naxçivan	22
(Italy) Feldi Eboli	23

Preliminary round
Team	Rank
(Finland) Kampuksen Dynamo	24
(Georgia (country)) Georgians Tbilisi	25
(Switzerland) Futsal Minerva	26
(Denmark) Futsal Gentofte	27
(Slovakia) MIMEL Lučenec	28
(Poland) Piast Gliwice	29
(Luxembourg) Differdange 03	30
(Armenia) Yerevan FC	31
(Greece) Doukas	32
(Germany) Stuttgarter FC	33
(England) London Helvécia	34
(Serbia) KMF Loznica-Grad	35
(Austria) Fortuna Wiener Neustadt	36
(Montenegro) KMF Titograd	37
(Republic of Ireland) Blue Magic Dublin	38
(Cyprus) APOEL Futsal	39
(Sweden) Örebro SK	40
(Estonia) Cosmos Tallinn	41
(Moldova) Nistru Chișinău	42
(Latvia) Petrow	43
(Albania) FK Tirana	44
(Scotland) PYF Saltires	45
(Andorra) FC Encamp	46
(Norway) Vesterålen Futsal	47
(Turkey) Istanbul Şişli	48
(Wales) FC Cardiff	49
(Israel) ASA Technion Haifa	50
(Bulgaria) Amigo Northwest	51
(Gibraltar) Europa FC	52
(San Marino) Folgore	53
(Northern Ireland) Belfast United	54
(Iceland) Ísbjörninn	55

1. The 2021–22 Serie A champions, Italservice Pesaro, withdrew from the tournament. Therefore, the runners-up Feldi Eboli were selected to be the Italian representatives.

== Format ==
The tournament has a mini-tournament format consisting of three qualifying rounds and the final tournament. The qualifying rounds consisted of the following stages:

- Preliminary round: 32 teams entering this round were divided into eight groups of four teams with the group winners advancing to the next round.
- Main round:
  - Path A: 16 teams entering this round were divided into four groups of four teams, with the group winners, runners-up, and third-placed teams advancing to the next round.
  - Path B: 8 teams that entered in this round and the 8 teams advancing from the preliminary round were divided into four groups of four teams, with the group winners advancing to the next round.
- Elite round: 16 teams advancing from the main round were divided into four groups of four teams, with the group winners qualifying for the final tournament.

In each group, teams played against each other in a single round-robin format hosted by one of the participating teams.

The final tournament is played at a centralized location and consisted of single-legged semi-finals, a third-place play-off, and final. If scores were level at the end of normal time, extra time was played, followed by a penalty shoot-out if the scores remained tied.

=== Tiebreakers ===
Teams were ranked according to points (3 points for a win, 1 point for a draw, 0 points for a loss). If two or more teams were tied on points, the following tiebreaking criteria were applied, in the order given, to determine the rankings (see Article 14 Equality of points – mini-tournaments, Regulations of the UEFA Futsal Champions League):

1. Points in head-to-head matches among the tied teams;
2. Goal difference in head-to-head matches among the tied teams;
3. Goals scored in head-to-head matches among the tied teams;
4. If more than two teams were tied, and after applying all head-to-head criteria above, a subset of teams are still tied, all head-to-head criteria above were reapplied exclusively to this subset of teams;
5. Goal difference in all group matches;
6. Goals scored in all group matches;
7. Disciplinary points (direct red card = 3 points; double yellow card = 3 points; single yellow card = 1 point);
8. UEFA futsal club coefficients.

If two teams that have the same number of points and have scored and conceded the same number of goals play their last mini-tournament match against each other and are still equal at the end of that match, their final rankings are determined by a penalty shoot-out provided that no other teams within the group have the same number of points on completion of the mini-tournament. This procedure is only necessary if a ranking of the teams is required to determine the team which qualifies for the next stage.

== Schedule ==
The schedule of the competition was as follows.

Schedule for 2022–23 UEFA Futsal Champions League
Phase	Round	Draw	Dates
Qualifying stage	Preliminary round	7 July 2022	24–28 August 2022
Qualifying stage	Main round	7 July 2022	25–30 October 2022
Qualifying stage	Elite round	3 November 2022	22–26 November 2022
Final tournament	Semi-finals	5 April 2023	5 May 2023
Final tournament	Third-place play-off & final	5 April 2023	7 May 2023

== Preliminary round ==
The draw for the preliminary round was held on 7 July 2022, 14:30 CEST. The preliminary round was played from 24 to 28 August 2022. The winners of each group advanced to the main round Path B.

Times are CEST, as listed by UEFA (local times, if different, are in parentheses).

=== Seeding ===
A total of 32 teams played in the preliminary round. Seeding of teams was based on their 2022 UEFA futsal club coefficients. Eight teams were pre-selected as hosts and were first drawn from a separate pot to their corresponding seeding position. The remaining teams were then drawn from their respective pots to their corresponding seeding position.

Seeding position 1	Seeding position 2	Seeding position 3	Seeding position 4
(Finland) Kampuksen Dynamo; (Georgia (country)) Georgians Tbilisi; (Switzerland) Futsal Minerva (H); (Denmark) JB Futsal Gentofte; (Slovakia) Lučenec; (Poland) Piast Gliwice; (Luxembourg) Differdange 03; (Armenia) Yerevan FC (H)	(Greece) Doukas (H); (Germany) Stuttgarter FC; (England) London Helvécia; (Serbia) Loznica-Grad; (Austria) Fortuna Wr. Neustadt (H); (Montenegro) KMF Titograd (H); (Republic of Ireland) Blue Magic Dublin; (Cyprus) APOEL	(Sweden) Örebro SK; (Estonia) Cosmos Tallinn (H); (Moldova) Nistru Chișinău; (Latvia) Petrow; (Albania) FK Tirana (H); (Scotland) PYF Saltires; (Andorra) Encamp; (Norway) Vesterålen Futsal	(Turkey) Istanbul Şişli (H); (Wales) FC Cardiff; (Israel) Technion Haifa; (Bulgaria) Amigo Northwest; (Gibraltar) Europa; (San Marino) Folgore; (Northern Ireland) Belfast United; (Iceland) Ísbjörninn

Notes

- H – Mini-tournament hosts

=== Group A ===
Pos	Team	Pld	W	D	L	GF	GA	GD	Pts	Qualification
1	(Finland) Kampuksen Dynamo	3	3	0	0	30	3	+27	9	Advance to main round
2	(Montenegro) KMF Titograd (H)	3	2	0	1	14	4	+10	6	
3	(Andorra) FC Encamp	3	1	0	2	7	16	−9	3	
4	(Iceland) Ísbjörninn	3	0	0	3	3	31	−28	0	

Source: UEFA
Rules for classification: Tiebreakers
(H) Hosts
24 August 2022
17:30

Kampuksen Dynamo (Finland)	17–0	(Iceland) Ísbjörninn
	Report

Verde Complex, Podgorica
Referee: Daniel Stauber (AUT),
Done Ristovski (MKD)
24 August 2022
20:30

FC Encamp (Andorra)	0–4	(Montenegro) KMF Titograd
	Report

Verde Complex, Podgorica
Referee: Kaloyan Kirilov (BUL),
Besar Beqiri (KOS)

25 August 2022
17:30

FC Encamp (Andorra)	1–10	(Finland) Kampuksen Dynamo
	Report

Verde Complex, Podgorica
Referee: Besar Beqiri (KOS),
Daniel Stauber (AUT)
25 August 2022
20:30

KMF Titograd (Montenegro)	8–1	(Iceland) Ísbjörninn
	Report

Verde Complex, Podgorica
Referee: Done Ristovski (MKD),
Kaloyan Kirilov (BUL)

27 August 2022
17:30

Ísbjörninn (Iceland)	2–6	(Andorra) FC Encamp
	Report

Verde Complex, Podgorica
Referee: Daniel Stauber (AUT),
Besar Beqiri (KOS)
27 August 2022
20:30

KMF Titograd (Montenegro)	2–3	(Finland) Kampuksen Dynamo
	Report

Verde Complex, Podgorica
Referee: Done Ristovski (MKD),
Kaloyan Kirilov (BUL)

=== Group B ===
Pos	Team	Pld	W	D	L	GF	GA	GD	Pts	Qualification
1	(Denmark) Futsal Gentofte	3	2	1	0	15	8	+7	7	Advance to main round
2	(Austria) Fortuna Wr. Neustadt (H)	3	2	0	1	14	6	+8	6	
3	(Bulgaria) Amigo Northwest	3	1	0	2	7	16	−9	3	
4	(Scotland) PYF Saltires	3	0	1	2	2	8	−6	1	

Source: UEFA
Rules for classification: Tiebreakers
(H) Hosts
24 August 2022
17:00

Futsal Gentofte (Denmark)	10–4	(Bulgaria) Amigo Northwest
	Report

Arena Nova, Wiener Neustadt
Referee: Arman Alaberkyan (ARM),
Turekhan Tursumbayev (KAZ)
24 August 2022
20:30

PYF Saltires (Scotland)	1–5	(Austria) Fortuna Wr. Neustadt
	Report

Arena Nova, Wiener Neustadt
Referee: Arttu Kyynäräinen (FIN),
Besart Ismajli (KOS)

25 August 2022
17:00

PYF Saltires (Scotland)	1–1	(Denmark) Futsal Gentofte
	Report

Arena Nova, Wiener Neustadt
Referee: Besart Ismajli (KOS),
Arman Alaberkyan (ARM)
25 August 2022
20:30

Fortuna Wr. Neustadt (Austria)	6–1	(Bulgaria) Amigo Northwest
	Report

Arena Nova, Wiener Neustadt
Referee: Turekhan Tursumbayev (KAZ),
Arttu Kyynäräinen (FIN)

27 August 2022
15:00

Amigo Northwest (Bulgaria)	2–0	(Scotland) PYF Saltires
	Report

Arena Nova, Wiener Neustadt
Referee: Arman Alaberkyan (ARM),
Arttu Kyynäräinen (FIN)
27 August 2022
18:30

Fortuna Wr. Neustadt (Austria)	3–4	(Denmark) Futsal Gentofte
	Report

Arena Nova, Wiener Neustadt
Referee: Turekhan Tursumbayev (KAZ),
Besart Ismajli (KOS)

=== Group C ===
Pos	Team	Pld	W	D	L	GF	GA	GD	Pts	Qualification
1	(Latvia) Petrow	3	2	0	1	21	12	+9	6 (Note: Tied on head-to-head-points (3). Head-to-head goal difference: Petrow +2, London Helvécia −1, Yerevan FC −1.)	Advance to main round
2	(England) London Helvécia	3	2	0	1	28	14	+14	6	
3	(Armenia) Yerevan FC (H)	3	2	0	1	25	12	+13	6	
4	(Gibraltar) Europa FC	3	0	0	3	2	38	−36	0	

Source: UEFA
Rules for classification: Tiebreakers
(H) Hosts
Notes:
24 August 2022
14:00

London Helvécia (England)	15–0	(Gibraltar) Europa FC
	Report

FFA Technical Center Academy, Yerevan
Attendance: 20
Referee: Igor Puzović (BIH),
Ademir Avdic (SWE)
24 August 2022
17:30

Petrow (Latvia)	7–2	(Armenia) Yerevan FC
	Report

FFA Technical Center Academy, Yerevan
Attendance: 420
Referee: Ivo Tsenov (BUL),
Bogdan Hanceariuc (ROU)

25 August 2022
14:00

Petrow (Latvia)	6–9	(England) London Helvécia
	Report

FFA Technical Center Academy, Yerevan
Attendance: 15
Referee: Bogdan Hanceariuc (ROU),
Igor Puzović (BIH)
25 August 2022
17:30

Yerevan FC (Armenia)	15–1	(Gibraltar) Europa FC
	Report

FFA Technical Center Academy, Yerevan
Attendance: 140
Referee: Ademir Avdic (SWE),
Ivo Tsenov (BUL)

27 August 2022
14:00

Europa FC (Gibraltar)	1–8	(Latvia) Petrow
	Report

FFA Technical Center Academy, Yerevan
Attendance: 5
Referee: Ivo Tsenov (BUL),
Igor Puzović (BIH)
27 August 2022
17:30

Yerevan FC (Armenia)	8–4	(England) London Helvécia
	Report

FFA Technical Center Academy, Yerevan
Attendance: 310
Referee: Bogdan Hanceariuc (ROU),
Ademir Avdic (SWE)

=== Group D ===
Pos	Team	Pld	W	D	L	GF	GA	GD	Pts	Qualification
1	(Serbia) KMF Loznica-Grad	3	3	0	0	30	6	+24	9	Advance to main round
2	(Switzerland) Futsal Minerva (H)	3	2	0	1	12	8	+4	6	
3	(Norway) Vesterålen Futsal	3	1	0	2	12	12	0	3	
4	(San Marino) Folgore	3	0	0	3	3	31	−28	0	

Source: UEFA
Rules for classification: Tiebreakers
(H) Hosts
25 August 2022
16:00

KMF Loznica-Grad (Serbia)	17–1	(San Marino) Folgore
	Report

Sporthalle Weissenstein, Bern
Referee: Hikmat Qafarli (AZE),
Mantas Pomeckis (LTU)
25 August 2022
19:15

Vesterålen Futsal (Norway)	2–3	(Switzerland) Futsal Minerva
	Report

Sporthalle Weissenstein, Bern
Referee: Idan Berenshtein (ISR),
Gordon McCabe (SCO)

26 August 2022
16:00

Vesterålen Futsal (Norway)	2–9	(Serbia) KMF Loznica-Grad
	Report

Sporthalle Weissenstein, Bern
Referee: Gordon McCabe (SCO),
Hikmat Qafarli (AZE)
26 August 2022
19:15

Futsal Minerva (Switzerland)	6–2	(San Marino) Folgore
	Report

Sporthalle Weissenstein, Bern
Referee: Mantas Pomeckis (LTU),
Idan Berenshtein (ISR)

28 August 2022
11:45

Folgore (San Marino)	0–8	(Norway) Vesterålen Futsal
	Report

Sporthalle Weissenstein, Bern
Referee: Mantas Pomeckis (LTU),
Hikmat Qafarli (AZE)
28 August 2022
15:00

Futsal Minerva (Switzerland)	3–4	(Serbia) KMF Loznica-Grad
	Report

Sporthalle Weissenstein, Bern
Referee: Idan Berenshtein (ISR),
Gordon McCabe (SCO)

=== Group E ===
Pos	Team	Pld	W	D	L	GF	GA	GD	Pts	Qualification
1	(Poland) Piast Gliwice	3	2	1	0	12	2	+10	7	Advance to main round
2	(Greece) Doukas (H)	3	2	1	0	14	6	+8	7	
3	(Moldova) Nistru Chișinău	3	1	0	2	10	10	0	3	
4	(Israel) ASA Technion Haifa	3	0	0	3	2	20	−18	0	

Source: UEFA
Rules for classification: Tiebreakers
(H) Hosts
24 August 2022
14:00

Piast Gliwice (Poland)	4–0	(Israel) ASA Technion Haifa
	Report

Korydallos Sports Hall, Korydallos
Referee: Maksim Dzeikala (BLR),
Martin Matula (SVK)
24 August 2022
18:00

Nistru Chișinău (Moldova)	2–4	(Greece) Doukas
	Report

Korydallos Sports Hall, Korydallos
Referee: Jagnar Jakobson (EST),
Mariia Myslovska (UKR)

25 August 2022
14:00

Nistru Chișinău (Moldova)	0–6	(Poland) Piast Gliwice
	Report

Korydallos Sports Hall, Korydallos
Referee: Mariia Myslovska (UKR),
Maksim Dzeikala (BLR)
25 August 2022
18:00

Doukas (Greece)	8–2	(Israel) ASA Technion Haifa
	Report

Korydallos Sports Hall, Korydallos
Referee: Martin Matula (SVK),
Jagnar Jakobson (EST)

27 August 2022
14:00

ASA Technion Haifa (Israel)	0–8	(Moldova) Nistru Chișinău
	Report

Korydallos Sports Hall, Korydallos
Referee: Mariia Myslovska (UKR),
Jagnar Jakobson (EST)
27 August 2022
18:00

Doukas (Greece)	2–2	(Poland) Piast Gliwice
	Report

Korydallos Sports Hall, Korydallos
Referee: Maksim Dzeikala (BLR),
Martin Matula (SVK)

=== Group F ===
Pos	Team	Pld	W	D	L	GF	GA	GD	Pts	Qualification
1	(Sweden) Örebro SK	3	3	0	0	17	7	+10	9	Advance to main round
2	(Georgia (country)) Georgians Tbilisi	3	2	0	1	14	11	+3	6	
3	(Germany) Stuttgarter FC	3	1	0	2	7	8	−1	3	
4	(Turkey) Istanbul Şişli (H)	3	0	0	3	9	21	−12	0	

Source: UEFA
Rules for classification: Tiebreakers
(H) Hosts
24 August 2022
14:00

Georgians Tbilisi (Georgia (country))	3–5	(Sweden) Örebro SK
	Report

Gazanfer Bilge Sports Hall, Kocaeli
Referee: Knyaz Amiraslanov (AZE),
Dražen Vukčević (MNE)
24 August 2022
16:30

Stuttgarter FC (Germany)	4–2	(Turkey) Istanbul Şişli
	Report

Gazanfer Bilge Sports Hall, Kocaeli
Referee: Raafat Al Hamola (ISR),
Carl Hughes (WAL)

25 August 2022
14:00

Stuttgarter FC (Germany)	2–4	(Georgia (country)) Georgians Tbilisi
	Report

Gazanfer Bilge Sports Hall, Kocaeli
Referee: Carl Hughes (WAL),
Knyaz Amiraslanov (AZE)
25 August 2022
16:30

Istanbul Şişli (Turkey)	3–10	(Sweden) Örebro SK
	Report

Gazanfer Bilge Sports Hall, Kocaeli
Referee: Dražen Vukčević (MNE),
Raafat Al Hamola (ISR)

27 August 2022
14:00

Örebro SK (Sweden)	2–1	(Germany) Stuttgarter FC
	Report

Gazanfer Bilge Sports Hall, Kocaeli
Referee: Knyaz Amiraslanov (AZE),
Dražen Vukčević (MNE)
27 August 2022
16:30

Istanbul Şişli (Turkey)	4–7	(Georgia (country)) Georgians Tbilisi
	Report

Gazanfer Bilge Sports Hall, Kocaeli
Referee: Raafat Al Hamola (ISR),
Carl Hughes (WAL)

=== Group G ===
Pos	Team	Pld	W	D	L	GF	GA	GD	Pts	Qualification
1	(Luxembourg) Differdange 03	3	3	0	0	24	4	+20	9	Advance to main round
2	(Albania) FK Tirana (H)	3	2	0	1	23	6	+17	6	
3	(Cyprus) APOEL	3	1	0	2	10	16	−6	3	
4	(Northern Ireland) Belfast United	3	0	0	3	4	35	−31	0	

Source: UEFA
Rules for classification: Tiebreakers
(H) Hosts
24 August 2022
17:00

Differdange 03 (Luxembourg)	13–0	(Northern Ireland) Belfast United
	Report

Tirana Olympic Park, Tirana
Referee: Jiri Bergs (BEL),
Monika Czudzinowicz (POL)
24 August 2022
20:45

APOEL (Cyprus)	2–5	(Albania) FK Tirana
	Report

Tirana Olympic Park, Tirana
Referee: Filip Nešněra (CZE),
George Jansizian (SWE)

25 August 2022
17:00

APOEL (Cyprus)	1–7	(Luxembourg) Differdange 03
	Report

Tirana Olympic Park, Tirana
Referee: George Jansizian (SWE),
Jiri Bergs (BEL)
25 August 2022
20:45

FK Tirana (Albania)	15–0	(Northern Ireland) Belfast United
	Report

Tirana Olympic Park, Tirana
Referee: Monika Czudzinowicz (POL),
Filip Nešněra (CZE)

27 August 2022
17:00

Belfast United (Northern Ireland)	4–7	(Cyprus) APOEL
	Report

Tirana Olympic Park, Tirana
Referee: Monika Czudzinowicz (POL),
George Jansizian (SWE)
27 August 2022
20:45

FK Tirana (Albania)	3–4	(Luxembourg) Differdange 03
	Report

Tirana Olympic Park, Tirana
Referee: Jiri Bergs (BEL),
Filip Nešněra (CZE)

=== Group H ===
Pos	Team	Pld	W	D	L	GF	GA	GD	Pts	Qualification
1	(Slovakia) MIMEL Lučenec	3	3	0	0	13	7	+6	9	Advance to main round
2	(Estonia) Cosmos Tallinn (H)	3	2	0	1	18	8	+10	6	
3	(Republic of Ireland) Blue Magic Dublin	3	1	0	2	14	11	+3	3	
4	(Wales) FC Cardiff	3	0	0	3	4	23	−19	0	

Source: UEFA
Rules for classification: Tiebreakers
(H) Hosts
25 August 2022
15:30

MIMEL Lučenec (Slovakia)	6–3	(Wales) FC Cardiff
	Report

Kalev Sports Hall, Tallinn
Referee: Darko Boskovic (SUI),
Joern Te Kloeze (NED)
25 August 2022
18:30

Blue Magic Dublin (Republic of Ireland)	3–8	(Estonia) Cosmos Tallinn
	Report

Kalev Sports Hall, Tallinn
Referee: Péter Zimonyi (HUN),
Murat Çolak (TUR)

26 August 2022
15:30

Blue Magic Dublin (Republic of Ireland)	1–2	(Slovakia) MIMEL Lučenec
	Report

Kalev Sports Hall, Tallinn
Referee: Murat Çolak (TUR),
Darko Boskovic (SUI)
26 August 2022
18:30

Cosmos Tallinn (Estonia)	7–0	(Wales) FC Cardiff
	Report

Kalev Sports Hall, Tallinn
Referee: Joern Te Kloeze (NED),
Péter Zimonyi (HUN)

28 August 2022
14:30

FC Cardiff (Wales)	1–10	(Republic of Ireland) Blue Magic Dublin
	Report

Kalev Sports Hall, Tallinn
Referee: Péter Zimonyi (HUN),
Joern Te Kloeze (NED)
28 August 2022
17:30

Cosmos Tallinn (Estonia)	3–5	(Slovakia) MIMEL Lučenec
	Report

Kalev Sports Hall, Tallinn
Referee: Darko Boskovic (SUI),
Murat Çolak (TUR)

== Main round ==
The draw for the main round was held on 7 July 2022, 14:30 CEST. The main round was played from 25 to 30 October 2022.

Times are CEST, as listed by UEFA (local times, if different, are in parentheses).

=== Seeding ===
A total of 32 teams played in the main round. They were divided in two paths:

- Path A (16 teams): the title holders and teams ranked 1–11 and 16–19.
- Path B (16 teams): teams ranked 12–15 and 20–23 and 8 teams advancing from the preliminary round.

Seeding of teams was based on their 2022 UEFA futsal club coefficients. On Path B, the seeding position 3 and 4 were drawn from the same pot, comprising all teams advancing from the preliminary round. Eight teams (four in each path) were pre-selected as hosts and were first drawn from a separate pot to their corresponding seeding position. The remaining teams were then drawn from their respective pots to their corresponding seeding position. Teams from Kosovo and Serbia, Kosovo and Bosnia and Herzegovina or Armenia and Azerbaijan could not be drawn into the same group.

Path A
Seeding position 1	Seeding position 2	Seeding position 3	Seeding position 4
(Spain) FC Barcelona; (Portugal) Sporting CP; (Portugal) Benfica; (Spain) Palma Futsal	(Kazakhstan) Kairat; (Slovenia) Dobovec; (Ukraine) Uragan; (Kazakhstan) Ayat	(Croatia) Novo Vrijeme (H); (Belgium) Anderlecht (H); (Netherlands) Hovocubo; (Hungary) Haladás	(Romania) United Galați (H); (Malta) Luxol St Andrews (H); (Croatia) Futsal Pula; (France) Sporting Paris

Path B
Seeding position 1	Seeding position 2	Seeding position 3 and 4	
(Czech Republic) FK Chrudim; (Lithuania) Kauno Žalgiris (H); (Belarus) Stalitsa Minsk; (Bosnia and Herzegovina) Mostar SG (H)	(Kosovo) Liqeni (H); (North Macedonia) Shkupi (H); (Azerbaijan) Araz Naxçivan; (Italy) Feldi Eboli	(Finland) Kampuksen Dynamo; (Denmark) JB Futsal Gentofte; (Slovakia) MIMEL Lučenec; (Poland) Piast Gliwice	(Luxembourg) Differdange 03; (Serbia) KMF Loznica-Grad; (Sweden) Örebro SK; (Latvia) Petrow

Notes

- H – Mini-tournament hosts
1. Prodexim Kherson was chosen by the UAF as the Ukrainian representatives for the 2022/23 UEFA Futsal Champions League, due to the premature end of the Ukrainian Extra-Liga because of the Russian invasion of Ukraine. On 14 September 2022, UEFA announced that due to the situation in the region and city of Kherson, Prodexim Kherson is not in a position to participate in the competition and will be replaced by Uragan Ivano-Frankivsk.

=== Path A ===
The top three teams of each group in Path A advanced to the elite round.

==== Group 1 ====
Pos	Team	Pld	W	D	L	GF	GA	GD	Pts	Qualification
1	(Spain) Palma Futsal	3	1	2	0	15	9	+6	5 (Note: Head-to-head results: Kairat 2–2 Anderlecht, Kairat 2–2 Palma Futsal, Anderlecht 2–2 Palma Futsal. Head-to-head standings: Palma Futsal: 2 pts, 0 GD (4 GF, 4 GA); Anderlecht: 2 pts, 0 GD (4 GF, 4 GA); Kairat: 2 pts, 0 GD (4 GF, 4 GA); Tied on head-to-head results. Overall goal difference is used as tiebreaker.)	Advance to elite round
2	(Belgium) Anderlecht (H)	3	1	2	0	8	4	+4	5	Advance to elite round
3	(Kazakhstan) Kairat	3	1	2	0	7	6	+1	5	Advance to elite round
4	(France) Sporting Paris	3	0	0	3	7	18	−11	0	

Source: UEFA
Rules for classification: Tiebreakers
(H) Hosts
Notes:
26 October 2022
17:00

Palma Futsal (Spain)	11–5	(France) Sporting Paris
	Report

Belleheide Sport Center, Roosdaal
Attendance: 400
Referee: Grigori Ošomkov (EST),
Josip Barton (MKD)
26 October 2022
20:30

Kairat (Kazakhstan)	2–2	(Belgium) Anderlecht
	Report

Belleheide Sport Center, Roosdaal
Attendance: 1,000
Referee: Kirill Naishouler (FIN),
Filipe Santos (POR)

27 October 2022
17:00

Kairat (Kazakhstan)	2–2	(Spain) Palma Futsal
	Report

Belleheide Sport Center, Roosdaal
Attendance: 150
Referee: Filipe Santos (POR),
Grigori Ošomkov (EST)
27 October 2022
20:30

Anderlecht (Belgium)	4–0	(France) Sporting Paris
	Report

Belleheide Sport Center, Roosdaal
Attendance: 485
Referee: Josip Barton (MKD),
Kirill Naishouler (FIN)

29 October 2022
17:00

Sporting Paris (France)	2–3	(Kazakhstan) Kairat
	Report

Belleheide Sport Center, Roosdaal
Attendance: 400
Referee: Grigori Ošomkov (EST),
Kirill Naishouler (FIN)
29 October 2022
20:30

Anderlecht (Belgium)	2–2	(Spain) Palma Futsal
	Report

Belleheide Sport Center, Roosdaal
Attendance: 1,000
Referee: Josip Barton (MKD),
Filipe Santos (POR)

==== Group 2 ====
Pos	Team	Pld	W	D	L	GF	GA	GD	Pts	Qualification
1	(Portugal) Sporting CP	3	3	0	0	19	4	+15	9	Advance to elite round
2	(Croatia) Novo Vrijeme (H)	3	1	1	1	4	9	−5	4	Advance to elite round
3	(Croatia) Futsal Pula	3	1	0	2	8	9	−1	3	Advance to elite round
4	(Kazakhstan) Ayat	3	0	1	2	5	14	−9	1	

Source: UEFA
Rules for classification: Tiebreakers
(H) Hosts
26 October 2022
18:00

Sporting CP (Portugal)	5–3	(Croatia) Futsal Pula
	Report

City Sports Center, Makarska
Attendance: 450
Referee: Ondřej Černý (CZE),
Denys Kutsyi (UKR)
26 October 2022
20:30

Ayat (Kazakhstan)	2–2	(Croatia) Novo Vrijeme
	Report

City Sports Center, Makarska
Attendance: 750
Referee: Cédric Pelissier (FRA),
Dario Pezzuto (ITA)

27 October 2022
18:00

Ayat (Kazakhstan)	1–7	(Portugal) Sporting CP
	Report

City Sports Center, Makarska
Attendance: 250
Referee: Dario Pezzuto (ITA),
Denys Kutsyi (UKR)
27 October 2022
20:30

Novo Vrijeme (Croatia)	2–0	(Croatia) Futsal Pula
	Report

City Sports Center, Makarska
Attendance: 850
Referee: Ondřej Černý (CZE),
Cédric Pelissier (FRA)

29 October 2022
18:00

Futsal Pula (Croatia)	5–2	(Kazakhstan) Ayat
	Report

City Sports Center, Makarska
Attendance: 300
Referee: Cédric Pelissier (FRA),
Ondřej Černý (CZE)
29 October 2022
20:30

Novo Vrijeme (Croatia)	0–7	(Portugal) Sporting CP
	Report

City Sports Center, Makarska
Attendance: 1,050
Referee: Denys Kutsyi (UKR),
Dario Pezzuto (ITA)

==== Group 3 ====
Pos	Team	Pld	W	D	L	GF	GA	GD	Pts	Qualification
1	(Spain) FC Barcelona	3	3	0	0	21	2	+19	9	Advance to elite round
2	(Malta) Luxol St Andrews (H)	3	1	1	1	7	9	−2	4 (Note: Tied on head-to-head results. Overall goal difference is used as tiebreaker.)	Advance to elite round
3	(Slovenia) Dobovec	3	1	1	1	4	9	−5	4	Advance to elite round
4	(Netherlands) Hovocubo	3	0	0	3	2	14	−12	0	

Source: UEFA
Rules for classification: Tiebreakers
(H) Hosts
Notes:
26 October 2022
16:00

FC Barcelona (Spain)	6–1	(Netherlands) Hovocubo
	Report

Tal-Qroqq Sports Hall, Gżira
Attendance: 130
Referee: Stefan Vrijens (BEL),
Miguel Castilho (POR)
26 October 2022
19:00

Dobovec (Slovenia)	1–1	(Malta) Luxol St Andrews
	Report

Tal-Qroqq Sports Hall, Gżira
Attendance: 160
Referee: Nicola Manzione (ITA),
Done Ristovski (MKD)

27 October 2022
16:00

Dobovec (Slovenia)	0–8	(Spain) FC Barcelona
	Report

Tal-Qroqq Sports Hall, Gżira
Attendance: 70
Referee: Done Ristovski (MKD),
Stefan Vrijens (BEL)
27 October 2022
19:00

Luxol St Andrews (Malta)	5–1	(Netherlands) Hovocubo
	Report

Tal-Qroqq Sports Hall, Gżira
Attendance: 140
Referee: Miguel Castilho (POR),
Nicola Manzione (ITA)

29 October 2022
16:00

Hovocubo (Netherlands)	0–3	(Slovenia) Dobovec
	Report

Tal-Qroqq Sports Hall, Gżira
Attendance: 75
Referee: Stefan Vrijens (BEL),
Miguel Castilho (POR)
29 October 2022
19:00

Luxol St Andrews (Malta)	1–7	(Spain) FC Barcelona
	Report

Tal-Qroqq Sports Hall, Gżira
Attendance: 600
Referee: Nicola Manzione (ITA),
Done Ristovski (MKD)

==== Group 4 ====
Pos	Team	Pld	W	D	L	GF	GA	GD	Pts	Qualification
1	(Portugal) Benfica	3	3	0	0	15	3	+12	9	Advance to elite round
2	(Ukraine) Uragan	3	1	1	1	10	8	+2	4	Advance to elite round
3	(Romania) United Galați (H)	3	1	0	2	5	15	−10	3	Advance to elite round
4	(Hungary) Haladás	3	0	1	2	7	11	−4	1	

Source: UEFA
Rules for classification: Tiebreakers
(H) Hosts
26 October 2022
16:00

Benfica (Portugal)	3–1	(Hungary) Haladás
	Report

Dunărea Sports Hall, Galați
Attendance: 515
Referee: Vedran Babić (CRO),
Kamil Çetin (TUR)
26 October 2022
19:00

Uragan (Ukraine)	5–0	(Romania) United Galați
	Report

Dunărea Sports Hall, Galați
Attendance: 875
Referee: Petar Radojčić (SRB),
Vasilios Christodoulis (GRE)

27 October 2022
16:00

Uragan (Ukraine)	1–4	(Portugal) Benfica
	Report

Dunărea Sports Hall, Galați
Attendance: 486
Referee: Vasilios Christodoulis (GRE),
Vedran Babić (CRO)
27 October 2022
19:00

United Galați (Romania)	4–2	(Hungary) Haladás
	Report

Dunărea Sports Hall, Galați
Attendance: 680
Referee: Kamil Çetin (TUR),
Petar Radojčić (SRB)

29 October 2022
13:00

Haladás (Hungary)	4–4	(Ukraine) Uragan
	Report

Dunărea Sports Hall, Galați
Attendance: 389
Referee: Vedran Babić (CRO),
Kamil Çetin (TUR)
29 October 2022
16:00

United Galați (Romania)	1–8	(Portugal) Benfica
	Report

Dunărea Sports Hall, Galați
Attendance: 1,113
Referee: Petar Radojčić (SRB),
Vasilios Christodoulis (GRE)

=== Path B ===
The winners of each group in Path B advanced to the elite round.

==== Group 5 ====
Pos	Team	Pld	W	D	L	GF	GA	GD	Pts	Qualification
1	(Serbia) KMF Loznica-Grad	3	3	0	0	12	5	+7	9	Advance to elite round
2	(Bosnia and Herzegovina) Mostar SG (H)	3	2	0	1	7	6	+1	6	
3	(Sweden) Örebro SK	3	1	0	2	10	11	−1	3	
4	(Azerbaijan) Araz Naxçivan	3	0	0	3	5	12	−7	0	

Source: UEFA
Rules for classification: Tiebreakers
(H) Hosts
26 October 2022
17:30

Araz Naxçivan (Azerbaijan)	2–5	(Sweden) Örebro SK
	Report

USCR Midhat Hujdur-Hujka, Mostar
Attendance: 150
Referee: David Urdánoz (ESP),
Lukáš Peško (SVK)
26 October 2022
20:00

KMF Loznica-Grad (Serbia)	2–1	(Bosnia and Herzegovina) Mostar SG
	Report

USCR Midhat Hujdur-Hujka, Mostar
Attendance: 456
Referee: Victor Chaix (FRA),
Jan Kresta (CZE)

27 October 2022
17:30

KMF Loznica-Grad (Serbia)	4–1	(Azerbaijan) Araz Naxçivan
	Report

USCR Midhat Hujdur-Hujka, Mostar
Attendance: 146
Referee: Jan Kresta (CZE),
Josip Dujmić (CRO)
27 October 2022
20:00

Mostar SG (Bosnia and Herzegovina)	3–2	(Sweden) Örebro SK
	Report

USCR Midhat Hujdur-Hujka, Mostar
Attendance: 406
Referee: Lukáš Peško (SVK),
Victor Chaix (FRA)

29 October 2022
17:30

Örebro SK (Sweden)	3–6	(Serbia) KMF Loznica-Grad
	Report

USCR Midhat Hujdur-Hujka, Mostar
Attendance: 146
Referee: Victor Chaix (FRA),
Josip Dujmić (CRO)
29 October 2022
20:00

Mostar SG (Bosnia and Herzegovina)	3–2	(Azerbaijan) Araz Naxçivan
	Report

USCR Midhat Hujdur-Hujka, Mostar
Attendance: 271
Referee: Jan Kresta (CZE),
Lukáš Peško (SVK)

==== Group 6 ====
Pos	Team	Pld	W	D	L	GF	GA	GD	Pts	Qualification
1	(Poland) Piast Gliwice	3	3	0	0	19	4	+15	9	Advance to elite round
2	(Belarus) Stalitsa Minsk	3	1	0	2	10	12	−2	3 (Note: Head-to-head results: JB Futsal Gentofte 3–4 Liqeni, JB Futsal Gentofte 4–3 Stalitsa Minsk, Liqeni 2–6 Stalitsa Minsk. Head-to-head standings: Stalitsa Minsk: 3 pts, +3 GD (9 GF, 6 GA); JB Futsal Gentofte: 3 pts, 0 GD (7 GF, 7 GA); Liqeni: 3 pts, -3 GD (6 GF, 9 GA))	
3	(Denmark) Futsal Gentofte	3	1	0	2	7	11	−4	3	
4	(Kosovo) Liqeni (H)	3	1	0	2	9	18	−9	3	

Source: UEFA
Rules for classification: Tiebreakers
(H) Hosts
Notes:
25 October 2022
16:00

Stalitsa Minsk (Belarus)	1–6	(Poland) Piast Gliwice
	Report

Palace of Youth and Sports, Pristina
Attendance: 50
Referee: Chiara Perona (ITA),
Admir Zahovič (SVN)
25 October 2022
20:00

Futsal Gentofte (Denmark)	3–4	(Kosovo) Liqeni
	Report

Palace of Youth and Sports, Pristina
Attendance: 300
Referee: Daniel Matkovic (SUI),
Vlad Nicolae Ciobanu (ROU)

26 October 2022
16:00

Futsal Gentofte (Denmark)	4–3	(Belarus) Stalitsa Minsk
	Report

Palace of Youth and Sports, Pristina
Attendance: 50
Referee: Vlad Nicolae Ciobanu (ROU),
Chiara Perona (ITA)
26 October 2022
20:00

Liqeni (Kosovo)	3–9	(Poland) Piast Gliwice
	Report

Palace of Youth and Sports, Pristina
Attendance: 300
Referee: Admir Zahovič (SVN),
Daniel Matkovic (SUI)

28 October 2022
16:00

Piast Gliwice (Poland)	4–0	(Denmark) Futsal Gentofte
	Report

Palace of Youth and Sports, Pristina
Attendance: 50
Referee: Daniel Matkovic (SUI),
Chiara Perona (ITA)
28 October 2022
20:00

Liqeni (Kosovo)	2–6	(Belarus) Stalitsa Minsk
	Report

Palace of Youth and Sports, Pristina
Attendance: 100
Referee: Vlad Nicolae Ciobanu (ROU),
Admir Zahovič (SVN)

==== Group 7 ====
Pos	Team	Pld	W	D	L	GF	GA	GD	Pts	Qualification
1	(Italy) Feldi Eboli	3	3	0	0	21	7	+14	9	Advance to elite round
2	(Lithuania) Kauno Žalgiris (H)	3	2	0	1	13	8	+5	6	
3	(Latvia) Petrow	3	1	0	2	8	17	−9	3	
4	(Finland) Kampuksen Dynamo	3	0	0	3	5	15	−10	0	

Source: UEFA
Rules for classification: Tiebreakers
(H) Hosts
26 October 2022
14:30

Feldi Eboli (Italy)	4–2	(Finland) Kampuksen Dynamo
	Report

Prienai Arena, Prienai
Attendance: 45
Referee: Nikola Jelić (CRO),
Javier Moreno (ESP)
26 October 2022
18:00

Petrow (Latvia)	1–4	(Lithuania) Kauno Žalgiris
	Report

Prienai Arena, Prienai
Attendance: 140
Referee: Cristiano Santos (POR),
Marjan Mladenovski (MKD)

27 October 2022
14:30

Petrow (Latvia)	3–10	(Italy) Feldi Eboli
	Report

Prienai Arena, Prienai
Attendance: 60
Referee: Marjan Mladenovski (MKD),
Nikola Jelić (CRO)
27 October 2022
18:00

Kauno Žalgiris (Lithuania)	7–0	(Finland) Kampuksen Dynamo
	Report

Prienai Arena, Prienai
Attendance: 115
Referee: Javier Moreno (ESP),
Cristiano Santos (POR)

29 October 2022
14:30

Kampuksen Dynamo (Finland)	3–4	(Latvia) Petrow
	Report

Prienai Arena, Prienai
Attendance: 68
Referee: Marjan Mladenovski (MKD),
Cristiano Santos (POR)
29 October 2022
18:00

Kauno Žalgiris (Lithuania)	2–7	(Italy) Feldi Eboli
	Report

Prienai Arena, Prienai
Attendance: 278
Referee: Nikola Jelić (CRO),
Javier Moreno (ESP)

==== Group 8 ====
Pos	Team	Pld	W	D	L	GF	GA	GD	Pts	Qualification
1	(Czech Republic) FK Chrudim	3	2	1	0	7	3	+4	7	Advance to elite round
2	(Luxembourg) Differdange 03	3	2	0	1	13	5	+8	6	
3	(Slovakia) MIMEL Lučenec	3	1	1	1	7	5	+2	4	
4	(North Macedonia) Shkupi (H)	3	0	0	3	2	16	−14	0	

Source: UEFA
Rules for classification: Tiebreakers
(H) Hosts
26 October 2022
17:00

FK Chrudim (Czech Republic)	2–2	(Slovakia) MIMEL Lučenec
	Report

Jane Sandanski Arena, Skopje
Attendance: 30
Referee: Ruben Cardoso (POR),
Aleš Močnik Perič (SVN)
26 October 2022
20:00

Differdange 03 (Luxembourg)	9–2	(North Macedonia) Shkupi
	Report

Jane Sandanski Arena, Skopje
Attendance: 300
Referee: Eduardo Fernandes (POR),
Peter Nurse (ENG)

27 October 2022
17:00

Differdange 03 (Luxembourg)	1–2	(Czech Republic) FK Chrudim
	Report

Jane Sandanski Arena, Skopje
Attendance: 30
Referee: Peter Nurse (ENG),
Ruben Cardoso (POR)
27 October 2022
20:00

Shkupi (North Macedonia)	0–4	(Slovakia) MIMEL Lučenec
	Report

Jane Sandanski Arena, Skopje
Attendance: 200
Referee: Aleš Močnik Perič (SVN),
Eduardo Fernandes (POR)

29 October 2022
17:00

MIMEL Lučenec (Slovakia)	1–3	(Luxembourg) Differdange 03
	Report

Jane Sandanski Arena, Skopje
Attendance: 30
Referee: Eduardo Fernandes (POR),
Ruben Cardoso (POR)
29 October 2022
20:00

Shkupi (North Macedonia)	0–3	(Czech Republic) FK Chrudim
	Report

Jane Sandanski Arena, Skopje
Attendance: 50
Referee: Aleš Močnik Perič (SVN),
Peter Nurse (ENG)

== Elite round ==
The draw for the elite round was held on 3 November 2022, 14:15 CET. The elite round was played from 22 to 26 November 2022.

Times are CET, as listed by UEFA (local times, if different, are in parentheses).

=== Seeding ===
A total of 16 teams played in the elite round. Seeding of teams was based on their results in the previous round:

- Seeding position 1: main round path A group winners.
- Seeding position 2: main round path A runners-up.
- Seeding positions 3 and 4 (drawn from the same pot): main round path A third-placed teams and path B group winners.

Six teams were pre-selected as hosts and were first drawn from a separate pot to their corresponding seeding position. Winners and runners-up from the same main round path A group could not be drawn into the same group.

Seeding position 1	Seeding position 2	Seeding positions 3 and 4	
(Spain) Palma Futsal (H); (Portugal) Sporting CP (H); (Spain) FC Barcelona; (Portugal) Benfica	(Belgium) Anderlecht; (Croatia) Novo Vrijeme; (Malta) Luxol St Andrews; (Ukraine) Uragan	(Kazakhstan) Kairat (H); (Croatia) Futsal Pula (H); (Slovenia) Dobovec; (Romania) United Galați	(Serbia) KMF Loznica-Grad; (Poland) Piast Gliwice (H); (Italy) Feldi Eboli (H); (Czech Republic) FK Chrudim

Notes

- H – Pre-selected to be mini-tournament hosts potentially

=== Group A ===
Pos	Team	Pld	W	D	L	GF	GA	GD	Pts	Qualification
1	(Portugal) Sporting CP	3	3	0	0	13	4	+9	9	Advance to final tournament
2	(Ukraine) Uragan	3	2	0	1	11	9	+2	6	
3	(Italy) Feldi Eboli (H)	3	1	0	2	6	12	−6	3	
4	(Serbia) KMF Loznica-Grad	3	0	0	3	3	8	−5	0	

Source: UEFA
Rules for classification: Tiebreakers
(H) Hosts
23 November 2022
17:00

Sporting CP (Portugal)	4–2	(Serbia) KMF Loznica-Grad
	Report

PalaJacazzi, Aversa
Attendance: 60
Referee: Juan Cordero (ESP),
Alejandro Martínez (ESP)
23 November 2022
20:30

Uragan (Ukraine)	7–4	(Italy) Feldi Eboli
	Report

PalaJacazzi, Aversa
Attendance: 800
Referee: Gábor Kovács (HUN),
Daniel Matkovic (SUI)

24 November 2022
17:00

Uragan (Ukraine)	2–4	(Portugal) Sporting CP
	Report

PalaJacazzi, Aversa
Attendance: 50
Referee: Daniel Matkovic (SUI),
Gábor Kovács (HUN)
24 November 2022
20:30

Feldi Eboli (Italy)	2–0	(Serbia) KMF Loznica-Grad
	Report

PalaJacazzi, Aversa
Attendance: 400
Referee: Alejandro Martínez (ESP),
Juan Cordero (ESP)

26 November 2022
17:00

KMF Loznica-Grad (Serbia)	1–2	(Ukraine) Uragan
	Report

PalaJacazzi, Aversa
Attendance: 50
Referee: Gábor Kovács (HUN),
Daniel Matkovic (SUI)
26 November 2022
20:30

Feldi Eboli (Italy)	0–5	(Portugal) Sporting CP
	Report

PalaJacazzi, Aversa
Attendance: 1,150
Referee: Juan Cordero (ESP),
Alejandro Martínez (ESP)

=== Group B ===
Pos	Team	Pld	W	D	L	GF	GA	GD	Pts	Qualification
1	(Spain) Palma Futsal (H)	3	3	0	0	15	3	+12	9	Advance to final tournament
2	(Poland) Piast Gliwice	3	2	0	1	10	8	+2	6	
3	(Croatia) Novo Vrijeme	3	0	1	2	3	7	−4	1	
4	(Slovenia) Dobovec	3	0	1	2	5	15	−10	1	

Source: UEFA
Rules for classification: Tiebreakers
(H) Hosts
23 November 2022
17:00

Novo Vrijeme (Croatia)	1–4	(Poland) Piast Gliwice
	Report

Palau Municipal d'Esports Son Moix, Palma
Attendance: 100
Referee: Victor Chaix (FRA),
Cédric Pelissier (FRA)
23 November 2022
20:15

Dobovec (Slovenia)	2–8	(Spain) Palma Futsal
	Report

Palau Municipal d'Esports Son Moix, Palma
Attendance: 2,612
Referee: Cristiano Santos (POR),
Eduardo Fernandes (POR)

24 November 2022
17:00

Dobovec (Slovenia)	1–1	(Croatia) Novo Vrijeme
	Report

Palau Municipal d'Esports Son Moix, Palma
Attendance: 100
Referee: Eduardo Fernandes (POR),
Cristiano Santos (POR)
24 November 2022
20:15

Palma Futsal (Spain)	5–0	(Poland) Piast Gliwice
	Report

Palau Municipal d'Esports Son Moix, Palma
Attendance: 2,467
Referee: Cédric Pelissier (FRA),
Victor Chaix (FRA)

26 November 2022
17:00

Piast Gliwice (Poland)	6–2	(Slovenia) Dobovec
	Report

Palau Municipal d'Esports Son Moix, Palma
Attendance: 100
Referee: Eduardo Fernandes (POR),
Cristiano Santos (POR)
26 November 2022
20:15

Palma Futsal (Spain)	2–1	(Croatia) Novo Vrijeme
	Report

Palau Municipal d'Esports Son Moix, Palma
Attendance: 2,700
Referee: Cédric Pelissier (FRA),
Victor Chaix (FRA)

=== Group C ===
Pos	Team	Pld	W	D	L	GF	GA	GD	Pts	Qualification
1	(Portugal) Benfica	3	2	1	0	11	4	+7	7	Advance to final tournament
2	(Czech Republic) FK Chrudim	3	1	2	0	7	6	+1	5	
3	(Malta) Luxol St Andrews	3	0	2	1	2	8	−6	2	
4	(Kazakhstan) Kairat (H)	3	0	1	2	2	4	−2	1	

Source: UEFA
Rules for classification: Tiebreakers
(H) Hosts
23 November 2022
13:30

Benfica (Portugal)	3–3	(Czech Republic) FK Chrudim
	Report

Baluan Sholak Sports Palace, Almaty
Attendance: 1,110
Referee: Vedran Babić (CRO),
Nikola Jelić (CRO)
23 November 2022
16:00

Luxol St Andrews (Malta)	0–0	(Kazakhstan) Kairat
	Report

Baluan Sholak Sports Palace, Almaty
Attendance: 2,900
Referee: Nicola Manzione (ITA),
Chiara Perona (ITA)

24 November 2022
13:30

Luxol St Andrews (Malta)	0–6	(Portugal) Benfica
	Report

Baluan Sholak Sports Palace, Almaty
Attendance: 890
Referee: Chiara Perona (ITA),
Nicola Manzione (ITA)
24 November 2022
16:00

Kairat (Kazakhstan)	1–2	(Czech Republic) FK Chrudim
	Report

Baluan Sholak Sports Palace, Almaty
Attendance: 2,300
Referee: Nikola Jelić (CRO),
Vedran Babić (CRO)

26 November 2022
13:30

FK Chrudim (Czech Republic)	2–2	(Malta) Luxol St Andrews
	Report

Baluan Sholak Sports Palace, Almaty
Attendance: 990
Referee: Nikola Jelić (CRO),
Vedran Babić (CRO)
26 November 2022
16:00

Kairat (Kazakhstan)	1–2	(Portugal) Benfica
	Report

Baluan Sholak Sports Palace, Almaty
Attendance: 3,456
Referee: Nicola Manzione (ITA),
Chiara Perona (ITA)

=== Group D ===
Pos	Team	Pld	W	D	L	GF	GA	GD	Pts	Qualification
1	(Belgium) Anderlecht	3	2	1	0	17	7	+10	7	Advance to final tournament
2	(Spain) FC Barcelona	3	2	1	0	18	9	+9	7	
3	(Croatia) Futsal Pula (H)	3	1	0	2	9	12	−3	3	
4	(Romania) United Galați	3	0	0	3	4	20	−16	0	

Source: UEFA
Rules for classification: Tiebreakers
(H) Hosts
23 November 2022
17:30

FC Barcelona (Spain)	6–2	(Romania) United Galați
	Report

Mate Parlov Sport Centre, Pula
Attendance: 602
Referee: Grigori Ošomkov (EST),
Petar Radojčić (SRB)
23 November 2022
20:30

Anderlecht (Belgium)	3–2	(Croatia) Futsal Pula
	Report

Mate Parlov Sport Centre, Pula
Attendance: 1,007
Referee: Kamil Çetin (TUR),
Marc Birkett (ENG)

24 November 2022
17:30

Anderlecht (Belgium)	5–5	(Spain) FC Barcelona
	Report

Mate Parlov Sport Centre, Pula
Attendance: 552
Referee: Petar Radojčić (SRB),
Grigori Ošomkov (EST)
24 November 2022
20:30

Futsal Pula (Croatia)	5–2	(Romania) United Galați
	Report

Mate Parlov Sport Centre, Pula
Attendance: 927
Referee: Marc Birkett (ENG),
Kamil Çetin (TUR)

26 November 2022
17:30

United Galați (Romania)	0–9	(Belgium) Anderlecht
	Report

Mate Parlov Sport Centre, Pula
Attendance: 472
Referee: Grigori Ošomkov (EST),
Petar Radojčić (SRB)
26 November 2022
20:30

FC Barcelona (Spain)	7–2	(Croatia) Futsal Pula
	Report

Mate Parlov Sport Centre, Pula
Attendance: 2,000
Referee: Marc Birkett (ENG),
Kamil Çetin (TUR)

== Final tournament ==
The four group winners from the Elite round played in the final tournament, which consisted of semifinals, a third-place play-off and a final. Palma Futsal were chosen as hosts at the UEFA Executive Committee meeting in Nyon, Switzerland on 13 February 2023, with the final tournament taking place at the Velòdrom Illes Balears in Palma de Mallorca, Spain, on 5 and 7 May 2023.

=== Qualified teams ===
In the following table, finals or final tournaments until 2018 were in the Futsal Cup era, since 2019 were in the UEFA Futsal Champions League era. All appearances in two-legged finals (2003–2006) or final tournaments (2007–2020 and 2022: four-team finals, 2002 and 2021: eight-team finals) are counted.

Group	Winners	Previous final tournament appearances (bold indicates winners)
A	(Portugal) Sporting CP	9 (2002, 2011, 2012, 2015, 2017, 2018, **2019**, **2021**, 2022)
B	(Spain) Palma Futsal (hosts)	0 (Debut)
C	(Portugal) Benfica	6 (2004, **2010**, 2011, 2016, 2021, 2022)
D	(Belgium) Anderlecht	0 (Debut)

=== Final draw ===
The draw for the final tournament was held on 5 April 2023, 12:00 CET, by Lionel Scaloni at the Aubamar Hotel in Palma. The four teams were drawn into two semi-finals without any restrictions.

=== Bracket ===
Semi-finals
5 May
**(Spain) Palma Futsal**	**4**
(Portugal) Benfica	3
5 May
**(Portugal) Sporting CP**	**7**
(Belgium) Anderlecht	1

Final
7 May
**(Spain) Palma Futsal**	**1 (5)**
(Portugal) Sporting CP	1 (3)
Third place
7 May
**(Portugal) Benfica**	**4**
(Belgium) Anderlecht	3

=== Semi-finals ===
5 May 2023
18:00

Sporting CP (Portugal)	7–1	(Belgium) Anderlecht
Cavinato 1'43"; Tomás Paçó 2'10"; Alex Merlim 3'16"; Edu 4'56" (o.g.); Neves 6'19", 28'45"; Erick 11'01"	Report	Jelovčić 25'28"

Palma Arena, Palma de Mallorca
Attendance: 1,241
Referee: Marc Birkett (England),
Kamil Çetin (Turkey)
5 May 2023
21:00

Palma Futsal (Spain)	4–3	(Portugal) Benfica
Tayyebi 1'19" (pen.), 17'11"; Mancuso 5'00"; Cainan 21'03"	Report	Chishkala 18'29"; Léo Gugiel 20'23"; Gonçalo Sobral 24'18"

Palma Arena, Palma de Mallorca
Attendance: 4,654
Referee: Nikola Jelić (Croatia),
Vedran Babić (Croatia)

=== Third place match ===
7 May 2023
17:00

Benfica (Portugal)	4–3	(Belgium) Anderlecht
Chishkala 5'44", 23'42"; Diego Nunes 26'16"; Arthur 29'03"	Report	Gréllo 16'59", 38'02"; Roncáglio 32'43"

Palma Arena, Palma de Mallorca
Attendance: 1,851
Referee: Gábor Kovács (Hungary),
Grigori Ošomkov (Estonia)

=== Final ===
7 May 2023
20:00

Palma Futsal (Spain)	1–1 (a.e.t.)	(Portugal) Sporting CP
Rivillos 13'56"	Report	Zicky Té 32'21"
Penalties
Tayyebi (penalty scored); Cainan (penalty scored); Marlon (penalty scored); Cléber (penalty scored); Rivillos (penalty scored)	5–3	Pany (penalty missed); Cavinato (penalty scored); Tomás Paçó (penalty scored); Erick (penalty scored)

Palma Arena, Palma de Mallorca
Attendance: 5,280
Referee: Ondřej Černý (Czech Republic),
Cédric Pelissier (France)

UEFA Futsal Champions League
2022–23 Winners

**Palma Futsal**
**1st Title**

== Statistics ==
- Preliminary round: There were 419 goals scored in 48 matches, for an average of 8.73 goals per match.
- Main round: There were 299 goals scored in 48 matches, for an average of 6.23 goals per match.
- Elite round: There were 136 goals scored in 24 matches, for an average of 5.67 goals per match.
- Final tournament: There were 24 goals scored in 4 matches, for an average of 6 goals per match.

=== Top goalscorers ===
Rank	Player	Team	Goals
1	(Brazil) Vinicius Lazzaretti	(Poland) Piast Gliwice	11
2	(Serbia) Mladen Kocić	(Serbia) KMF Loznica-Grad	9
2	(Finland) Jere Intala	(Finland) Kampuksen Dynamo	9
4	(Iran) Hossein Tayyebi	(Spain) Palma Futsal	7
4	(Portugal) Hugo Neves	(Portugal) Sporting CP	7
4	(Brazil) Vinícius Rocha	(Portugal) Benfica	7
4	(Brazil) Dudu	(Serbia) KMF Loznica-Grad	7
4	(Portugal) Miguel Ângelo	(Poland) Piast Gliwice	7
4	(Latvia) Artjoms Kozlovskis	(Latvia) Petrow	7
4	(Paraguay) Richard Rejala	(Luxembourg) Differdange 03	7
4	(Brazil) Italo Bob	(Finland) Kampuksen Dynamo	7
4	(Brazil) Newton Jr	(Finland) Kampuksen Dynamo	7
4	(Brazil) Denerson Moreira	(England) London Helvécia	7

=== Top assists ===
Rank	Player	Team	Assists
1	(Italy) Alex Merlim	(Portugal) Sporting CP	9
2	(Belgium) Gréllo	(Belgium) Anderlecht	7
2	(Finland) Lassi Lintula	(Finland) Kampuksen Dynamo	7
2	(Finland) Jukka Kytölä	(Finland) Kampuksen Dynamo	7
5	(Spain) Mario Rivillos	(Spain) Palma Futsal	6
5	(Iran) Moslem Oladghobad	(Spain) Palma Futsal	6
5	(Brazil) Arthur	(Portugal) Benfica	6
5	(Brazil) Pito	(Spain) FC Barcelona	6
5	(Brazil) Luizinho	(Italy) Feldi Eboli	6
