= MFC Ushkyn-Iskra =

- Full name: Ushkyn-Iskra Astana Sport Club PC NSC RK
- Nickname(s): Security officer's
- Founded: 1999
- Ground: Alatau Sportcomplex, Astana, Kazakhstan
- Chairman: Yerlan Zhamantayev
- Manager: Murat Kudaibergenov
- League: Premier League
- 2014-15: 5

Ushkyn-Iskra Astana Sport Club PC NSC RK is a futsal club based in Astana. The club was founded in 1999 and its pavilion is the Alatau Sportcomplex.

== History ==
The club was founded in 1999 under the name of "Iskra". The victory in the first league of Kazakhstan became the first success. In a season of 1999/00, debuted in the championship of Kazakhstan and took the seventh place. The bronze medal of the Cup of Kazakhstan in 2009 was won.

== Performances in Championat of Kazakhstan ==
Season	League	Taken Place	Games	Victories	Draws	Losses	+/- heads	Points
1999-00	Championat	7	14	3	1	10	77-116	10
2000-01	Championat	8	11	5	0	6	66-65	15
2001-02	Championat	5	19	11	4	4	112-96	37
2002-03	Championat	11	28	6	4	18	81-160	22
2003-04	Championat	9	32	2	2	28	81-223	8
2004-05	Championat	7	18	1	1	16	29-116	4
2006-07	didn't act							
2007-08	didn't act							
2008-09	Championat	5	20	1	0	19	57-119	3
2009-10	Championat	4	24	6	1	17	75-134	19
2010-11	Championat	4	21	0	1	20	54-153	1
2011-12	Championat	4	32	17	2	13	174-154	53
2012–2013	Championat	7	36	10	2	24	143-234	32
2013–2014	Championat	5	28	8	2	18	80-162	26
2014–2015	Championat	5	24	4	1	19	67-172	13

== Players ==
No.	Player	Date of birth	Nationality
Goalkeepers
1	Ilya Volkov	05.10.1990	Russia
Players
2	Kanat Kuanyshbayev	23.11.1981	Kazakhstan
3	Daniyar Khasanov	19.02.1983	Kazakhstan
4	Viktor Radionov	28.01.1981	Kazakhstan
5	Gafur Orynbasarov	26.11.1992	Kazakhstan
6	Artyom Yerokhovich	29.09.1988	Kazakhstan
7	Stanislav Vasilyev	11.08.1990	Kazakhstan
8	Roman Budnichenko	22.01.1997	Kazakhstan
9	Timur Doshanov	25.02.1988	Kazakhstan
10	Yalkunzhan Khoshnazarov	09.11.1990	Kazakhstan
11	Murat Kudaibergenov	05.07.1986	Kazakhstan
13	Gani Zhadigerov	01.06.1997	Kazakhstan

== Honours ==
- Kazakhstani Futsal Cup

Bronze (1): 2009
