= MFC Munaishy =

- Full name: Munaishy Zhanaozen Mini-Football Club
- Nickname(s): Oil industry worker's
- Founded: 2011
- Ground: PIC of Rakhmet Utesinov, Zhanaozen, Kazakhstan
- Capacity: 1,000
- Chairman: Bauirzhan Korganbayev
- Manager: Oleg Solodovnik
- League: Premier League
- 2014-15: 4
- Website: http://www.ozenmunaigaz.kz

Munaishy Zhanaozen Mini-Football Club is a futsal club based in Zhanaozen, a city of Mangystau Province. The club was founded in 2011 and its pavilion is the PIC of Rakhmet Utesinov with capacity of 1,000 seated spectators.

== History ==
The club was founded in 2011 under the name of "Ozenmunaigas". The victory in the first league of Kazakhstan became the first success. In a season of 2012/13, debuted in the championship of Kazakhstan and took the sixth place. The bronze medal of the Cup of Kazakhstan in 2013 was won. In 2015 it was officially reported about disbandment of "Munaishy".

== Performances in Championat of Kazakhstan ==
Season	League	Taken Place	Games	Victories	Draws	Losses	+/- heads	Points
2012-13	Championat	6	36	14	3	19	152-170	45
2013-14	Championat	5	25	12	3	13	122-111	39
2014–2015	Championat	4	32	9	1	22	60-132	16

== Players ==
No.	Player	Date of birth	Nationality
Goalkeepers
1	Kirill Ermolov	06.10.1984	Kyrgyzstan
2	Yeldos Murzabayev	23.02.1993	Kazakhstan
12	Oleksiy Sagaydachenko	18.02.1985	Ukraine
Players
3	Nurlan Turymov	19.02.1991	Kazakhstan
4	Sagyndyk Kydyrbayev	22.03.1996	Kazakhstan
5	Makhanbet Eshanov	09.09.1984	Kazakhstan
6	Nurbek Karagulov	14.10.1992	Kazakhstan
7	Manas Zhanuzakov	14.10.1992	Kazakhstan
8	Sundetkali Mamayev	18.11.1985	Kazakhstan
9	Bekzhan Dauletov	21.03.1988	Kazakhstan
10	Nurym Kenzhebayev	31.01.1985	Kazakhstan
11	Altynbek Zhumagaliyev	20.08.1993	Kazakhstan
13	Bruno	30.03.1993	Brazil
14	Richard Yesebayev	06.01.1984	Kazakhstan
15	Stanislav Kononenko	10.10.1985	Ukraine
16	Dilvo	29.06.1984	Brazil
17	Yerlan Karakulov	17.01.1990	Kazakhstan
18	Vitali Skoriy	06.11.1983	Ukraine
19	Arman Talasbayev	08.09.1995	Kazakhstan
20	Zhanibek Kalenov	18.02.1996	Kazakhstan
22	Merei Saktaganov	24.10.1995	Kazakhstan
77	Vassura	26.04.1985	Brazil

== Honours ==
- Kazakhstani Futsal Cup

Bronze (1): 2013
