= 2014–15 Kazakhstani Futsal Championship =

RBK Kazakhstani Futsal Championship
- Season: 2014–15
- Champions: Kairat
- Relegated: CSKA Astana
- UEFA Futsal Cup: Kairat; Tulpar
- Matches played: 85
- Goals scored: 737 (8.67 per match)
- Top goalscorer: Chyngys Essenamanov (Tulpar); Nikolai Pengrin (Tulpar) – 28 goals
- Biggest home win: Kairat 18–0 CSKA Astana
- Biggest away win: Ushkyn-Iskra 0–14 Kairat
- Highest scoring: Tulpar 14–5 Ushkyn-Iskra

The 2014–15 season of the RBK Kazakhstani Futsal Championship is the 17th season of top-tier futsal in Kazakhstan.

== 2014–15 season teams ==
Locations of teams in the 2014-15 RBK Kazakhstan Futsal Championship

Team	Location	Stadium
Ayat	Rudny	Gornyak Sportcomplex
CSKA Astana	Astana	Alatau Sportcomplex
Kairat	Almaty	Kairat Sportcomplex
Munaishy	Zhanaozen	PIC of Rakhmet Utesinov
Tulpar	Karaganda	Tulpar Sportcomplex
Ushkyn-Iskra	Astana	Alatau Sportcomplex

== Preliminary round table ==
Pos	Team	Pld	W	D	L	GF	GA	GD	Pts	Qualification or relegation
1	Kairat	20	20	0	0	179	25	+154	60	Qualification to the final round
2	Tulpar	20	16	0	4	120	52	+68	48	Qualification to the final round
3	Ayat	20	11	0	9	98	95	+3	33	Qualification to the final round
4	Munaishy	20	8	1	11	49	72	−23	25	Qualification to the final round
5	Ushkyn-Iskra	20	3	0	17	51	153	−102	9	
6	CSKA Astana	20	1	1	18	38	138	−100	4	Relegation to 2015–16 First Division

Updated to match(es) played on 19 February 2015. Source: UEFA – RBK Kazakhstani Futsal Championship
Rules for classification: 1) points; 2) head-to-head points; 3) head-to-head goal difference; 4) goal difference; 5) number of goals scored

== Final round ==
=== Championship round ===
==== League table ====
Pos	Team	Pld	W	D	L	GF	GA	GD	Pts	Qualification or relegation
1	Kairat	12	11	0	1	57	20	+37	33	2015–16 UEFA Futsal Cup
2	Tulpar	12	9	0	3	60	27	+33	27	2015–16 UEFA Futsal Cup
3	Ayat	12	3	0	9	33	55	−22	9	
4	Munaishy	12	1	0	11	11	59	−48	3	

Updated to match(es) played on 17 April 2015. Source: UEFA – RBK Kazakhstani Futsal Championship
Rules for classification: 1) points; 2) head-to-head points; 3) head-to-head goal difference; 4) goal difference; 5) number of goals scored

=== Relegation round ===
==== League table ====
Pos	Team	Pld	W	D	L	GF	GA	GD	Pts	Qualification or relegation
1	Ushkyn-Iskra	4	2	1	1	14	11	+3	7	
2	CSKA Astana	4	1	1	2	11	14	−3	4	Relegation to 2015–16 First Division

Updated to match(es) played on 17 April 2015. Source: UEFA – RBK Kazakhstani Futsal Championship
Rules for classification: 1) points; 2) head-to-head points; 3) head-to-head goal difference; 4) goal difference; 5) number of goals scored

== Final table ==
Pos	Team	Pld	W	D	L	GF	GA	GD	Pts	Qualification or relegation
1	Kairat	32	31	0	1	250	51	+199	93	2015–16 UEFA Futsal Cup
2	Tulpar	32	25	0	7	180	79	+101	75	2015–16 UEFA Futsal Cup
3	Ayat	32	14	0	18	138	163	−25	42	
4	Munaishy	32	9	1	22	60	132	−72	28	
5	Ushkyn-Iskra	24	4	1	19	67	172	−105	13	
6	CSKA Astana	24	3	2	19	57	154	−97	11	Relegation to 2015–16 First Division

Updated to match(es) played on 17 April 2015. Source: UEFA – RBK Kazakhstani Futsal Championship
Rules for classification: 1) points; 2) head-to-head points; 3) head-to-head goal difference; 4) goal difference; 5) number of goals scored

== Top scorers ==
Final round only

#	Player	Club	Goals
1	(Kazakhstan) Chingiz Yesenamanov	Tulpar	28
1	(Kazakhstan) Nikolai Pengrin	Tulpar	28
3	(Brazil) Alexandre	Kairat	26
4	(Brazil) Bolinha	Tulpar	25
4	(Brazil) Joan	Kairat	25
6	(Brazil) Igor Rafael Lima de Souza	Kairat	23
6	(Brazil) Leo Jaraguá	Kairat	23
6	(Brazil) Douglas Júnior	Kairat	23
9	(Kazakhstan) Mikhail Pershin	Kairat	21
9	(Kazakhstan) Stanislav Vasilyev	Ushkyn-Iskra	21
