= BTA Futsal =

- Full name: BTA Futsal Almaty Mini-Football Club
- Nickname: Banker's
- Founded: 2007
- Ground: Dostyk Sportcomlex, Almaty, Kazakhstan
- Capacity: 1,500
- Chairman: Sagyndyk Kusainov
- Manager: Boris Glushkov
- League: Premier League
- 2012-13: 3
- Website: http://www.bta-futsal.kz/

BTA Futsal Almaty Mini-Football Club is a futsal club based in Almaty. The club was founded in 2007 and its pavilion is the Dostyk Sportcomplex with capacity of 1,500 seated spectators.

== History ==
The club was founded in 2007 under the name "BTA Ipoteka". The victory in the first league of Kazakhstan became the first success. In a season of 2011/12, debuted in the championship of Kazakhstan, and at once won bronze medals. Silver medals of the Cup of Kazakhstan in 2011, 2012 were twice won. In September, 2013 it was officially reported about disbandment of "BTA Futsal".

== Players ==
No.	Player	Date of birth	Nationality
Goalkeepers
1	Pavel Barabanov	31.01.1981	Kazakhstan
20	Grigori Shamro	31.05.1984	Kazakhstan
Players
2	Dilshod Irsaliyev	31.12.1983	Uzbekistan
4	Shukhrat Tojiboev	18.02.1981	Uzbekistan
7	Asylbek Mukhamediyarov	17.02.1984	Kazakhstan
8	Shyngys Koralasbayev	06.12.1991	Kazakhstan
9	Askhat Alzhaksin	09.03.1983	Kazakhstan
10	Kairat Kulbarakov	29.07.1981	Kazakhstan
11	Oleg Halmuhamedov	25.11.1985	Uzbekistan
12	Stanislav Kononenko	10.10.1985	Kazakhstan
13	Farhod Abdumavlyanov	12.11.1987	Uzbekistan
14	Azamat Aselkan	28.01.1989	Kazakhstan
17	Nurzhan Abdrasilov	17.03.1991	Kazakhstan
18	Yermek Abdylbayev	30.01.1989	Kazakhstan
23	Dinmukhambet Shakhabayev	01.08.1983	Kazakhstan
46	Marat Adilbekov	12.12.1982	Kazakhstan
55	Nurseit Torekul	26.02.1993	Kazakhstan

== Honours ==
- Premier League

Bronze (2): 2011-12, 2012-13

- Kazakhstani Futsal Cup

Finalist (2): 2011, 2012
