= Cainan de Matos =

Italian futsal player

Cainan
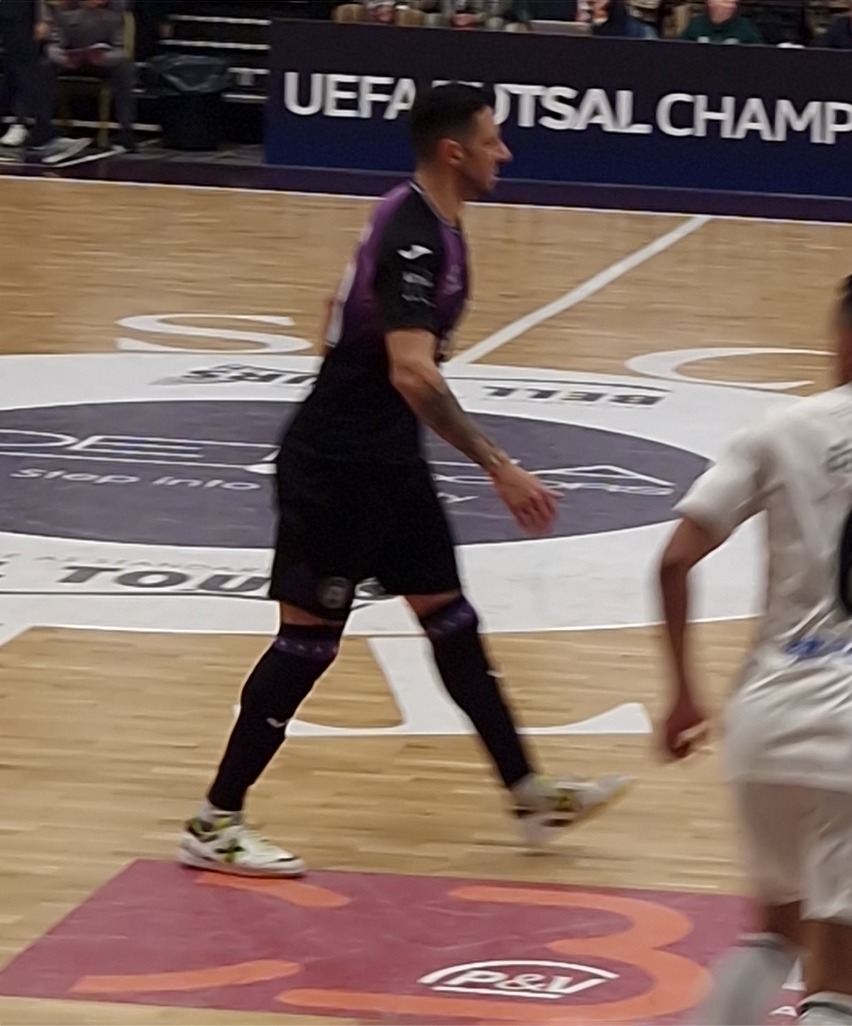
- Cainan with RSCA Futsal during the 2025–26 Champions League

Personal information
- Full name: Cainan Dalpaz de Matos
- Date of birth: 27 January 1990 (age 36)
- Place of birth: Tapera, Brasil
- Position: Winger

Team information
- Current team: RSC Anderlecht Futsal

Senior career*
Years	Team	Apps	(Gls)
2007–2009	America-Tapera		
2009–2012	LCF Martina		
2012–2013	Viagrande		
2013–2017	Cisternino		
2017–2018	Napoli		
2018–2019	CAME Dosson		
2019–2021	Valdepeñas		
2021–2023	Palma		
2023–	Anderlecht		

International career
2021–	Italia	17	(9)
- * Club domestic league appearances and goals

Cainan de Matos (born 27 January 1990), known simply as Cainan, is a Brazilian-Italian futsal player who plays for RSC Anderlecht Futsal in the Belgian Futsal Division 1, and the Italian national futsal team.

Born in Brasil, Cainan arrived in 2009 in Italy, being signed up by the newly formed L.C. Five Martina. He remained there for three seasons, contributing to the team's climb from Serie C2 to A2 (the result of 3 promotions in as many years) and to the victory of the Coppa Italia Serie B in 2012.

In the summer of 2013 he moved to Cisternino. Also here, he was among the protagonists of a team that managed to promote from Serie C1 to Serie A, also winning his second Coppa Italia B in 2015.

In the 2017–18 season he made his debut in the top division, scoring a hat-trick in the victorious away match against Pescara. The following summer he was purchased by CAME Dosson with whom he scored 22 goals during the regular season, finishing second in the goalscoring charts.

Holding a dual citizenship, on 17 January 2022 he was included in Italy's final list for the 2022 European Championship.

With AE Palma Futsal, Cainan won the UEFA Futsal Champions League in the 2022–23 season, after a penalty shoot-out against Sporting CP.

One month later, RSC Anderlecht Futsal announced the transfer of Cainan. In his first season, Cainan scored 28 goals in 35 matches, with the club winning the Belgian Championship for a third time in a row.

== Honours ==
=== Club ===
Palma

- UEFA Futsal Champions League: 2022–23

Anderlecht

- Belgian Futsal Division 1: 2023–24, 2024–25
- Belgian Cup: 2023–24, 2024–25
- Belgian Super Cup: 2024

=== Individual ===
- Futsal Champions League Team of the Tournament: 2022–23
