= Oleg Solodovnik =

Russian and Ukrainian futsal coach (born 1966)

Personal information
- Date of birth: December 11, 1966 (age 59)
- Place of birth: Dnepropetrovsk, USSR

Senior career*
Years	Team	Apps	(Gls)
1989–1991	Mechanizator	10	(1)
1992–1994	Dina Moskva	66	(19)
1994	Phoenix	9	(1)
1994	Pittsburg Stingers	28	(15)
1994–1996	Mechanizator-Metallist		
1997–1999	Intercas		
1999–2000	Schachtar		

Managerial career
- 2001–2010: Schachtar
- 2010–2012: Iberia Star
- 2012–2014: Yenakievets
- 2014–2015: Munaishy
- * Club domestic league appearances and goals

Oleg Solodovnik (born December 11, 1966, in Dnepropetrovsk, USSR) is a Russian and Ukrainian futsal coach, as well as a former football and futsal player. He is notable for his performance in the Russian futsal club Dina Moscow and National teams of USSR, CIS, Russia and Ukraine.

== Biography ==
Solodovnik started playing football in 1982 in football school No.12 of Dnepropetrovsk. In 1989, he was invited in the local futsal club Mehanizator. There he won USSR Futsal Cup and participated in USSR Futsal Championship. He performed well and was invited to Dina Moscow.

In Dina he spent two seasons and won two titles of Russian champion. After Dina he played a little bit in Fenix (Chelyabinsk) and moved to USA, where for three months was playing for Pittsburgh Stingers. Then he moved back to Ukraine and played there for Mehanizator-Metallist, Interkas and Shakhtar Donetsk.

Solodovnik played in most matches of USSR and CIS National teams. With Russian national team he participated in Futsal World Championship 1992. After that Oleg made his debut in Ukraine national team.

In 2001 Solodovnik became the head coach of Shakhtar Donetsk. He spent in the club 8 years, won five national championships, three national cups and became the most titled coach in the history of Ukrainian futsal.

In 2010-12 worked in Georgian futsal club Iberia Star. Until 2014 trained futsal club Enakieyevets, situated in Donetsk region. In 2014 due to war he left the region and moved to Kazakhstan.

Since August 2016 he has been a head coach of Kazakhstan team "Aktobe".

== Achievements ==
=== Player ===
- CIS champion: 1992
- Russian champion: 1992/93, 1993/94
- USSR Futsal Cup: 1991
- Russian Cup: 1992-1993
- Cup winner of major league: 1993
- Ukrainian Cup: 1999

=== Coach ===
- Ukrainian champion: 2002, 2004, 2005, 2006, 2008
- Ukrainian Cup: 2003, 2004, 2006
- Georgian champion: 2011
- Bronze medallist of Kazakhstan championship: 2016-2017
