= Arnold Knaub =

Kazakhstani futsal player (born 1995)

Personal information
- Date of birth: 16 January 1995 (age 31)
- Place of birth: Karagandy, Kazakhstan
- Position: Defender

Team information
- Current team: Kairat

Senior career*
Years	Team	Apps	(Gls)
2013–2016	Tulpar		
2016–2020	Zhetysu		
2020–2021	Aktobe		
2021–2022	Dinamo-Samara		
2022–2023	Caspiy Aktau		
2023–2024	Kairat		
2024–	Astana Futsal		

International career
2016–	Kazakhstan		
Medal record
Men's futsal
Representing Kazakhstan
UEFA Futsal Championship
Bronze medal – third place	2016 Serbia
- * Club domestic league appearances and goals

Arnold Knaub (born 16 January 1995) is a Kazakhstani futsal player who plays for Kairat and the Kazakhstani national team.

== Club career ==
Raised in the youth sector of Tulpar, Knaub made his debut in the first team at a very young age, also playing some UEFA Cup matches. In 2016 he moved to Zhetysu and then, in 2020, to Aktobe. In October 2021 he was signed by the Russian team Dinamo-Samara.

== International career ==
On 22 January 2016, Knaub made his debut for the Kazakhstani national team in a 3–1 friendly win against Uzbekistan. The same year he was included in the list of players called up for the UEFA Futsal Euro 2016, which Kazakhstan finished in third place, as well as for the World Cup, in which the Kazakhs reached the round of 16. He also took part in the following edition of the World Cup with the national team, and on 27 September, during the quarter-final win against Iran, he earned his 50 cap for the national team, also scoring his twelfth goal. In September 2024, Knaub was included in the Kazakh squad for the 2024 FIFA Futsal World Cup.

== Honours ==
Kazakhstan

- UEFA Futsal Championship third place: 2016
