= MFC Tulpar =

- Full name: Tulpar-Astana Mini-Football Club
- Founded: 2001
- Dissolved: 2016
- Ground: Tulpar Sportcomplex, Karaganda, Kazakhstan
- Capacity: 400
- Chairman: Anatoli Smotritskiy
- Manager: Amirzhan Mukanov
- League: Premier League
- 2014-15: 2
- Website: http://www.mfktulpar.kz/index.php?lang=en

Tulpar Karaganda Mini-Football Club is a futsal club based in Karaganda. The club was founded in 2001 and its pavilion is the Tulpar Sportcomplex with capacity of 400 seated spectators.

== History ==
The futsal club "Tulpar" was founded on October 1, 2001. In a year of a debut of 2001-2002 the team took the fourth place from 15 teams and became a heel in the Ural Cup-2002 tournament. In a season 2002-2003 "Tulpar" became the runner-up of the V Championship of Kazakhstan and came through to the semifinal a Cup of Kazakhstan. Also in this season the team participated in the first International tournament "Tulpar Cup" and became his owner. In different years on a prestigious tournament in Kazakhstan "Tulpar's Cup" the strongest collectives from Russia participated: "Spartak Moscow", "Norilsk Nickel", "Dina", "Spartak Shchelkovo", "Tyumen", and also national teams and teams of the CIS countries: "Ekol" (Azerbaijan), national teams of Uzbekistan and Kyrgyzstan.

In a season 2003-2004 "Tulpar" wins silver again and for the first time in the history of club becomes the cup winner of Kazakhstan. In the next season 2004-2005 collective takes the second place in the VII Championship of Kazakhstan and comes through to the semifinal the Cup of Kazakhstan.

Since the beginning of the club, the trainer's headquarters sought to invite extraordinary players. Therefore, already at the beginning players as Sioridze, Rudnitsky, Lermontov, Kravchenko played. On the course of the first season the first nonresident football player Maxim Batov from Ekibastuz — the player fast, able to outplay any defender one in one was invited. There were first legionaries from Ukraine — Shpichka and Kostenko later. Russian legionaries Kuznetsov, Ilnitsky, and later Samokhvalov, Krasilnikov, Konnov and Chudinov joined, with involvement of the Kazakhstan players of Reshetnikov, Karimov and Erzhanov invited as well.

To win first place in the VIII Championship of Kazakhstan the decision to strengthen a squad the Brazilian football players was made: Biro Jade, Mucado and Roni. At the beginning of a season of 2005/2006 the team was allocated with the quite good handwriting unlike others. She could play in different combinations different soccer. But after the 13th round of the Championship of Kazakhstan the decision to act from the Championship of Kazakhstan, in connection with financial problems of club was made.

After disbandment of the main Tulpar team, the main attention of the management of club, in the professional plan, was given to the younger team "Tulpar — 2". In a season 2006-2007 senior it graduates of 1988-89 year of birth made a youth team "Tulpar". In this season the team didn't participate in the Championship of Kazakhstan, but became the winner Championship of the Karaganda province and the cup winner of the Karaganda province −2007. For this period "Tulpar" successfully the Gold fall-2006 tournament in the city of Astana. With "Tur Arom" conceded Round in a semi-final on a penalty shootout (full-time 6:6) and took the third place. The team won a money prize and a prize of spectator sympathies. Besides, Alexander Dovgan became the top scorer, and Chyngys Essenamanov is recognized as the best defender of a tournament.

In a season 2007-2008 on the basis of two Karaganda teams "Tulpar" and "Ikar" the new team is formed. In the X Championship of Kazakhstan Karaganda was represented by the integrated Tulpar-Ikar team which basis was made by pupils of the Karaganda futsal school "Tulpar", also strengthened by the Brazilian legionaries Live, Suya and Jeraldo. Following the results of a season "Tulpar-Ikar" took the 4th place.

In a season 2008-2009 team acts under the habitual name "Tulpar" again. During early preparation the team won the VIII International games in Kyrgyzstan and there was the second on the V International tournament "Tulpar Cup". In the Cup of Kazakhstan 2008/09 "Tulpar" took the third place. In the XI Championship of Kazakhstan "Tulpar" fights for prize-winning places in a playoffs stage.

At the end of 2008 the youth team of Kazakhstan headed by the head coach of the national team Amirzhan Mukanov left in final part of the first European championship (U-21). Frame of youth team was made by players of IFC "Tulpar": Essenamanov, Dovgan, Pershin, Nurgozhin, Grebonos, Mukanov, Kozulkin.

In February, 2009 the national team of Kazakhstan under 21 leadership of the head coach Amirzhan Mukanov left in the following qualification round of the European championship-2010. The basis of the national team was made by young tulparovsky players: Essenamanov, Dovgan, Pershin, Pengrin, Nurgozhin.

In a season 2009/2010 "Tulpar" was in a step from a gain of the Cup of Kazakhstan, but in the final in Karaganda conceded to "Kairat" 2:4. This season became for team silver in the Championship of Kazakhstan.

In a season 2010/2011 IFC "Tulpar", 7 years later, again becomes the cup winner of Kazakhstan, having won against the immemorial opponent of "Kairat" in the final in the city of Kostanay, with the score 3:2. In a season of 2010-2011 Tulpar already ahead of schedule for three rounds to a steel end of the championship by runners-up, besides, this year the national team of Kazakhstan headed all trainer's headquarters of IFC "Tulpar", and frame of team made eight players of Tulpar.

2011/2012 also became significant in the history of club. Having won two matches "Kairat" (on September 20 in Almaty — 3:1 and 25 September in Karaganda — 2:1) IFC "Tulpar" won Kazakhstan Super Cup. Besides, in this season the team for the third time won the Cup of Kazakhstan and became the runner-up Championship of Kazakhstan, having lagged behind the champion of "Kairat" on 1 point.

2012/2013 seventh times in the history of steel runners-up of the Championship of Kazakhstan and owners of bronze medals of the First Cup of Owners of Cups of the European countries in Yugorsk.

== European record ==
=== Matches ===
Season	Competition	Round	Opponent	Score
2013-14	UEFA Futsal Cup	MR	(Ukraine) Lokomotiv	2–2
2013-14	UEFA Futsal Cup	MR	(Italy) Marca Futsal	2–2
2013-14	UEFA Futsal Cup	MR	(France) Sporting Club de Paris	6–1
2013-14	UEFA Futsal Cup	ER	(Bosnia and Herzegovina) Tango	8–3
2013-14	UEFA Futsal Cup	ER	(Belarus) VitEn	4–2
2013-14	UEFA Futsal Cup	ER	(Kazakhstan) Kairat	1–7

=== Notes ===
- MR: Main round
- ER: Elite round

== Players ==
No.	Player	Date of birth	Nationality
Goalkeepers
1	Miodrag Aksentijević	22.07.1983	Serbia
16	Konstantin Peremyshlin	16.01.1983	Kazakhstan
23	Asylkhan Alin	29.09.1996	Kazakhstan
Players
2	Pavel Taku	30.08.1988	Kazakhstan
3	Ilya Mun	02.08.1993	Kazakhstan
4	Feitosa Thales	13.04.1988	Brazil
5	Dauren Nurgozhin	21.05.1990	Kazakhstan
7	Arnold Knaub	16.01.1995	Kazakhstan
8	Mikhail Pershin	19.10.1989	Kazakhstan
9	Bolinha Thiago	19.03.1987	Brazil
10	Chyngys Yessenamanov	10.03.1989	Kazakhstan
11	Aleksandr Dovgan	09.02.1988	Kazakhstan
13	Vladislav Chernomordov	17.07.1995	Kazakhstan
14	Bauirzhan Kukumbayev	12.10.1995	Kazakhstan
15	Roman Shorin	26.08.1990	Kazakhstan
17	Alex	19.01.1982	Brazil
18	Vitaly Mattis	23.04.1986	Kazakhstan
22	Agedil Madiyarov	03.11.1995	Kazakhstan
24	Alexander Grebonos	09.10.1987	Kazakhstan

== Honours ==
- Premier League

Runners-up (9): 2002-03, 2003-04, 2004-05, 2009-10, 2010-11, 2011-12, 2012-13, 2013-14, 2014-15
Bronze (1): 2008-09

- Kazakhstani Futsal Supercup

Winners(2): 2010, 2011

- Kazakhstani Futsal Cup

Winners (3): 2003-04, 2010-11, 2011-12
Finalist (3): 2008-09, 2013-14, 2014-15
