= Korydallos Sports Hall =

Sports arena in Athens, Greece

- Korydallos Indoor Hall
- Interactive map of Korydallos Sports Hall
- Full name: Korydallos Sports Hall "Theodoros Poutos"
- Location: Korydallos, Piraeus, Greece
- Owner: General Secretariat of Sports
- Capacity: Basketball: 2,387 (permanent tiered seating); 3,000 (with removable tiered seating)
- Surface: Parquet

Construction
- Opened: 1994
- Renovated: 2003, 2004
- Expanded: 2003, 2004

Tenant
- Olympiacos (2002–2004)

Korydallos Sports Hall (Greek: Κλειστό Γυμναστήριο Κορυδαλλού) is an indoor arena that is located in Korydallos, Piraeus, Greece. It is a part of the Korydallos Municipal Sports Center. The arena is mainly used to host volleyball and basketball games. It has a permanent seating capacity of 2,387 people, and can hold up to 3,000 people with additional removable tiered seating.

== History ==
Korydallos Indoor Hall opened in 1994. The Greek Basket League and EuroLeague club Olympiacos, used the arena as its home arena, during the 2002–03 and 2003–04 seasons.
