= MFC Ayat =

- Full name: Ayat Rudny Mini-Football Club
- Founded: 1985
- Ground: Gornyak Sportcomplex, Rudny, Kazakhstan
- Capacity: 1,500
- Chairman: Kairat Kazbekov
- Manager: Kanat Talakpaev
- League: Premier League
- 2014–15: 3
- Website: http://www.sport-ayat.kz/en/

Ayat Rudny Mini–Football Club is a futsal club based in Rudny, a city of Kostanay Province. The club was founded in 1985 and its home court is the Gornyak Sportcomplex with capacity of 1,500 seated spectators.

== History ==
The club was created under the name "Stroitel" in 1985.

=== Ayr "Stroitel"s of 1985–2002 ===
In 1989 "Stroitel" takes the second place in Championship of the USSR on five-a-side, in 1995 in Grodno, (Belarus) on the International five-a-side tournament where teams from Poland, Belarus, Ukraine took part, the Stroitel takes the 1st place.

In 1999 in the International five-a-side Championship of the Republic of Kazakhstan among teams of a superleague of "Stroitel" win gold medals, having become the first Champions of the Republic of Kazakhstan in this sport.

In 1999 the Kazakhstan national futzal team from the club "Stroitel" (Talgat Baimuratov, Artem Glebov, Sergey Ilyukhin and Igor Klinov) played in the Championship of Asia (Malaysia) for its first time and taking home the bronze medal. In 2000 - the runner-up (Thailand).

In the 2001–02 season won bronze medal of the championship. The club's next season was extremely unsuccessful. The club season record is 17 out of 19.

After that season the club was disbanded.

=== Renaissance of club 2007–present ===
In 2007 the MFC "Ayat" is created. In 2007 following the results of Championship of Republic of Kazakhstan on a futsal among the first league teams in which 6 teams from all Republic took part the "Ayat" team wins first place and receives the permit in the top division. Same year the "Ayat" for a prize of the President of the Football Union of Kazakhstan on a futsal wins first place in a tournament.

In 2008 participation in the X Republic of Kazakhstan Championship on a futsal among teams of the Premier League of a season of 2007–2008 takes the 5th place.

In 2009 in XI Republic of Kazakhstan Championship on a futsal of a season of 2008/2009 the "Ayat" took the 4th place, lagging behind on only 2 points the third place. Two team players were Republic of Kazakhstan national team on a futsal Grigory Shamro, Askhat Alzhaksin. Sergey Starovoytov having become the member of youth team of Kazakhstan on a futsal, I participated in a final tournament of the European countries of youth teams, taking place in the city of St. Petersburg. In the same season the youth team of "Ayat–dubl" which showed good performance in the five–a–side Championship of the Kostanay Province was formed having taken 1 place.

In 2010 for the first time in the history of "Ayat", having become the third in draw of the XV Cup on a futsal, I continued a "Bronze" series and in the XIII Championship of the Republic of Kazakhstan on a futsal among teams of the Premier League. Aleksandr Metelkin the legionary from Russia "Ayat" playing in structure is recognized as the top scorer of the Cup and the Republic of Kazakhstan Championship. Five players of club were a part of a national team of Kazakhstan on a futsal: Grigory Shamro, Nikolay Kazakov, Timur Murzabayev, Daniyar Kenzhegulov, Aleksandr Yakimenko.

In a season 2011–12 team takes the 7th place, and in 2013 enters the five of the best.

== Performances in Championat of Kazakhstan ==
Season	League	Taken Place	Games	Victories	Draws	Losses	+/- heads	Points
1998–1999	Championat	1	8	6	1	1	42–27	19
1999–00	Championat	5	14	6	2	6	72–59	20
2000–01	Championat	3	11	8	0	3	50–33	24
2001–02	Championat	20	19	2	0	17	31–83	6
2002–03	didn't act							
2003–04	didn't act							
2004–05	didn't act							
2006–07	didn't act							
2007–08	Championat	5	24	8	0	16	107–155	24
2008–09	Championat	4	32	11	8	13	118–130	41
2009–10	didn't act							
2010–11	Championat	3	21	7	4	10	108–98	25
2011–12	Championat	7	32	10	1	21	123–177	31
2012–2013	Championat	5	36	18	3	15	208–170	57
2013–2014	Championat	3	40	19	2	19	236–211	59
2014–2015	Championat	3	32	14	0	18	238–163	26

== Squad ==
As of 4 May 2019

#	Position	Name	Nationality
1	Goalkeeper	Alexander Gurov	(Kazakhstan)
4	Winger	Alexey Lopatyuk	(Kazakhstan)
5	Universal	Carlos Recife	(Brazil)
7	Pivot	Azat Valiullin	(Kazakhstan)
8	Winger	Wanderson Silva	(Brazil)
9	Winger	Ersultan Sagyndykov	(Kazakhstan)
10	Winger	Hebbert de Jesus	(Brazil)
11	Winger	Eric Nascimento	(Brazil)
13	Winger	Ruslan Bulatov	(Kazakhstan)
14	Defender	Douglas Graciano	(Brazil)
15	Pivot	Vadim Buldin	(Kazakhstan)
18	Winger	Yeldos Dzhaksybaev	(Kazakhstan)
19	Winger	Ulan Zhaxylykov	(Kazakhstan)
21	Goalkeeper	Vadim Shivarov	(Kazakhstan)
23	Goalkeeper	Vasiliy Smolin	(Kazakhstan)
28	Winger	Mirambek Bikeev	(Kazakhstan)
88	Winger	Anton Ryndin	(Kazakhstan)

== Honours ==
- Premier League

Winners (1): 1998–99
Bronze (4): 2000–01, 2010–11, 2013–14, 2014–15

- Kazakhstani Futsal Cup

Winners(1): 1999
Bronze (2): 2011, 2014

- Futsal World Tournament (Grodno)

Winners(1): 1995

- Soviet Futsal Top League

Runners–up (1): 1989
