= Zhanaozen =

Zhanaozen Jañaözen / Жаңаөзен (Kazakh) Жанаозен (Russian)
- Town
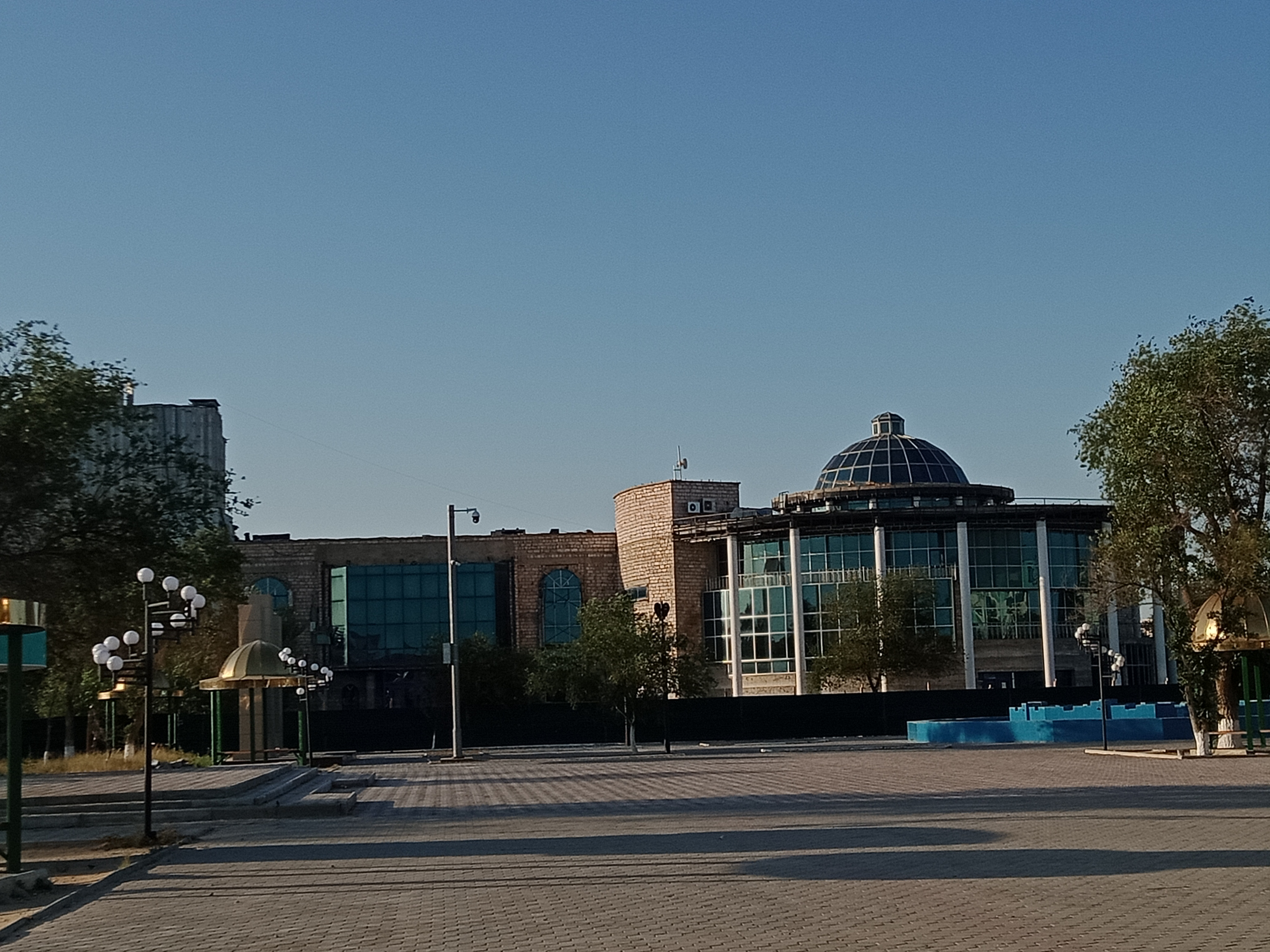
- House of culture in Zhanaozen

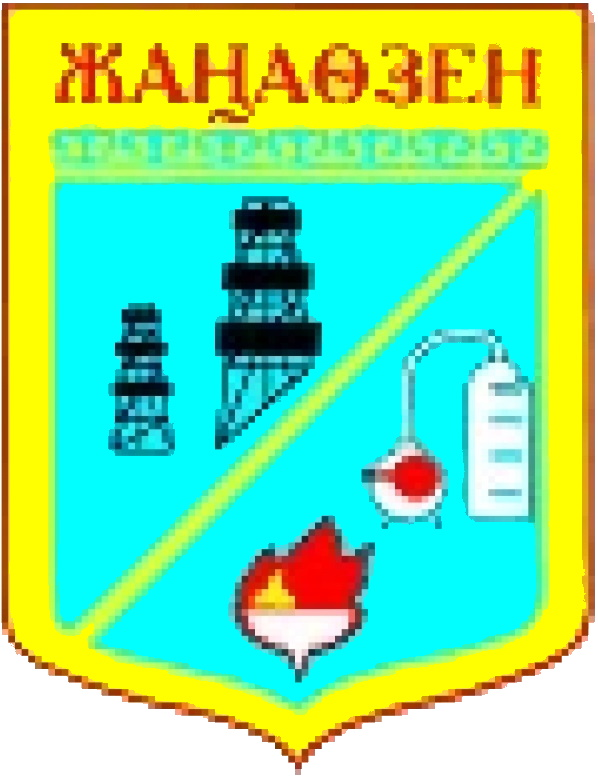
- Seal
- Nickname: Town of oil industry workers
- Location in Kazakhstan
- Coordinates: 43°20′16″N 52°51′19″E
- Country: Kazakhstan
- Region: Mangystau Region

Government
  - Akim (mayor): Zhanseit Kaynarbayev

Area
  - Total: 516 km^{2} (199 sq mi)
- Elevation: 171 m (561 ft)

Population (2018)
  - Total: 147,962
  - Density: 287/km^{2} (743/sq mi)
  - Ethnicities: Kazakhs Russians and others
  - Religions: Islam and Orthodox Christianity
- Time zone: UTC+5
- Telephone code: +72934
- Microregions: 17
- Website: www.zhanaozen.gov.kz/kz

Zhanaozen or Janaozen (/ˌdʒɑːnəˈɒzən/; Kazakh: Jañaözen / Жаңаөзен [ʒɑˌŋɑɵˈzʲen]), formerly known as Novy Uzen (Russian: Новый Узень [ˈnovɨj ʊˈzʲen]), is a city in the Mangystau Region of southwestern Kazakhstan located southeast of the city of Aktau. The name of the town means "new river" in Kazakh. Zhanaozen is a city of regional significance. It is completely surrounded by the territory of Karakiya District, but administratively does not belong to the district. It had a population of 147,962 in 2018; the census population in 2009 was 113,014, and that in 1999 had been 63,337.

== History ==
The town of Zhanaozen was founded in 1964, after the opening of an oil field in Uzen. On 21 October 1968 Novy Uzen took the status of a settlement of town type, and since 20 March 1973 the status of a city of regional significance. In June 1989, riots broke out in the town targeting its Armenian, Azerbaijani, and Lezgin communities, culminating in 7,000 people demanding that they be sent back to the Caucasus. Soviet reports stated that 3 people were killed in the riots, another 53 were injured, and hundreds were briefly evacuated from the town. While the immediate catalyst for the riot was a fight that took place between teenagers at a discotheque, it was fueled by complaints about living standards, low pay, and high prices. Novy Uzen was renamed Zhanaozen in October 1993.

=== 2011 oil strike ===
In May 2011, workers from the Ozenmunaigas oil field went on strike over pay. The strike was declared illegal by local courts and the state oil company sacked nearly 1000 employees. Some of the sacked workers then occupied the town square in protest. On 16 December 2011 police were accused of firing on them. Fifteen people (workers and police officers) were killed according to government officials, though opposition sources put the death toll in the dozens. In disturbances that day local government offices, a hotel and an office of the state oil company were set on fire, according to General Prosecutor Askhat Daulbayev. Eighty-six people were injured in the clashes – according to the authorities – and due to shortage of hospital beds in Zhanaozen, many were taken to be treated in the regional capital Aktau, about 150 km away.

=== 2022 protests ===
The 2022 Kazakh protests began in Zhanaozen after a sharp increase in gas prices (the Kazakh government claiming this was due to high demand and price fixes), corruption, authoritarianism, human rights violations, and police brutality. The protest soon spread to other regions of Kazakhstan, and as of Jan 8, 2022, the government has resigned and the new government has promised to change the gas prices to 50 Kazakhstani tenge for the next 6 months.

== Demographics ==
The population as of April 1, 2022 was 82,431 people, or 11.04% of the total population of the region. The territory of the city akimat was home to 160,626 people, of which Kazakhs (98.67%), Russians (0.67%), Karakalpaks (0.18%), Uzbeks (0.15%). In addition to the city, the Zhanaozen city administration also includes the village of Tenge with a population of 15.8 thousand people and the village of Kyzylsay with a population of 5.8 thousand people. In 2012, the village of Rakhat was formed as part of the city.

== Location and geography ==
Zhanaozen is located in the desert on Mangyshlak Peninsula.

== Climate ==
Zhanaozen has a cold desert climate (Köppen climate classification BWk) with sharp continental influences. Strong winds are present on a big extent of year. Winters not long, but rather frosty. Average winter temperature -5 -7 degrees Celsius, can sometimes reach -15 -17 degrees Celsius. Snow cover low power. Strong winds cause long snowstorms. Summer always hot, droughty and long. Average summer temperature +34 +36 degrees Celsius, can sometimes reach +45 degrees Celsius. The extremely rare rains have storm character. Average annual amount of precipitation of 120 mm. Rainfall is evenly distributed for all year slightly the increase in rainfall is observed during the spring period.

Climate data for Zhanaozen
Month	Jan	Feb	Mar	Apr	May	Jun	Jul	Aug	Sep	Oct	Nov	Dec	Year
Mean daily maximum °C (°F)	0.8 (33.4)	1.3 (34.3)	7.3 (45.1)	17.2 (63.0)	24.7 (76.5)	29.7 (85.5)	32.7 (90.9)	32.6 (90.7)	25.7 (78.3)	16.8 (62.2)	9.1 (48.4)	3.3 (37.9)	16.8 (62.2)
Daily mean °C (°F)	−2.9 (26.8)	−2.7 (27.1)	2.8 (37.0)	11.5 (52.7)	18.7 (65.7)	23.5 (74.3)	26.6 (79.9)	25.7 (78.3)	19.5 (67.1)	11.6 (52.9)	5.1 (41.2)	0.3 (32.5)	11.6 (53.0)
Mean daily minimum °C (°F)	−6.5 (20.3)	−6.7 (19.9)	−1.6 (29.1)	5.9 (42.6)	12.7 (54.9)	17.4 (63.3)	20.5 (68.9)	18.8 (65.8)	13.3 (55.9)	6.4 (43.5)	1.1 (34.0)	−2.6 (27.3)	6.6 (43.8)
Average precipitation mm (inches)	8 (0.3)	8 (0.3)	14 (0.6)	16 (0.6)	16 (0.6)	9 (0.4)	8 (0.3)	6 (0.2)	7 (0.3)	11 (0.4)	13 (0.5)	12 (0.5)	128 (5)
Source: https://en.climate-data.org/location/25822/

== Population ==
Population of the town with the adjacent villages of Kyzylsay (3,500 people), Tenge (18,700 people) and Rakhat (30,800 people) for the end of the 2012 reporting period made 129,600 people or 22.3% of the total population of the Mangystau region. In comparison, of 2012 the population increased on 4,500 people due to birth rate growth. National structure - Kazakhs, Russians, Karakalpaks and other nations.

== Sport ==
=== Sports clubs ===
Futsal club of Munaishy acting in the championship of Kazakhstan on a futsal.

=== Sports constructions ===
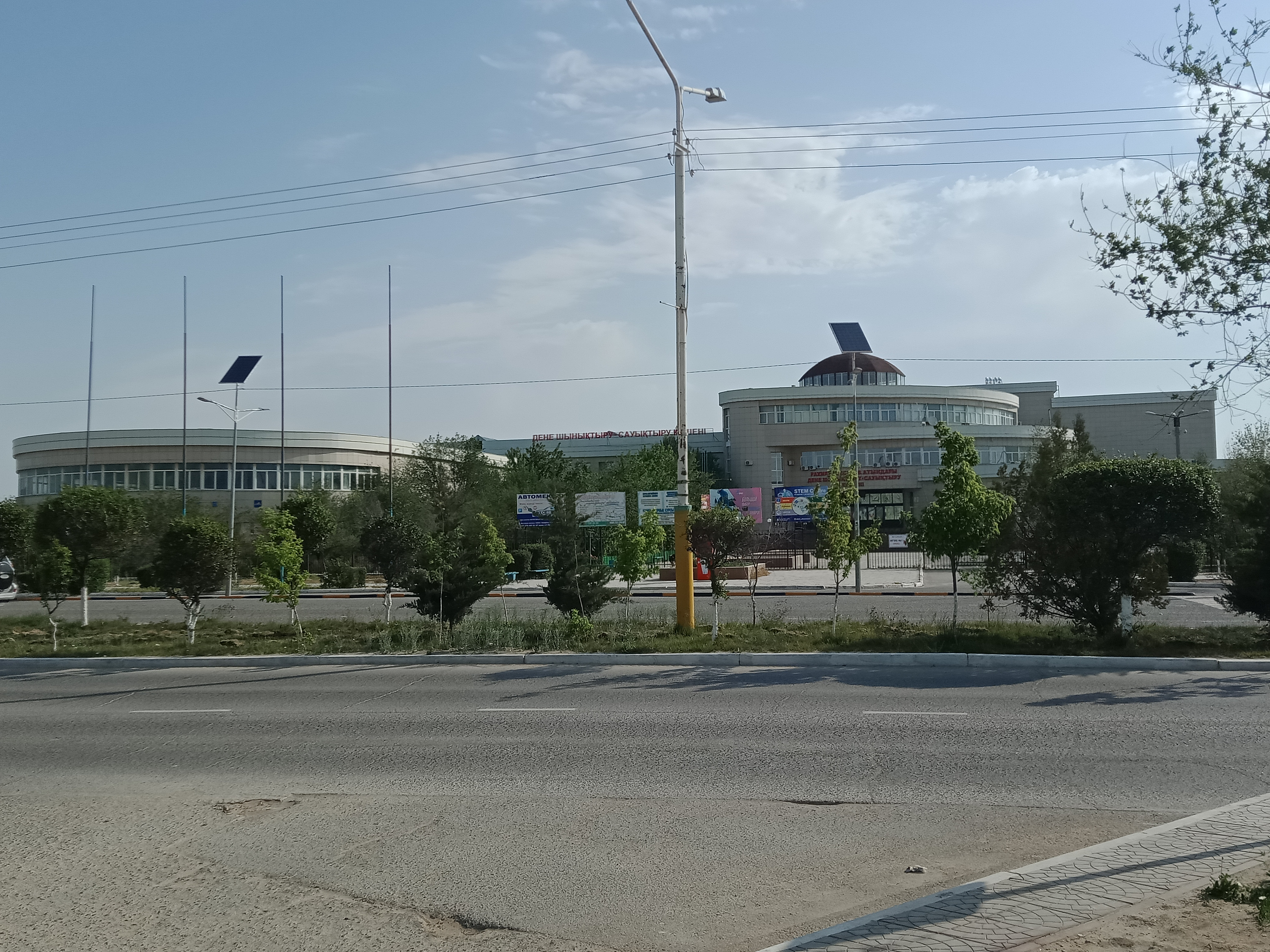
Physical culture-improvements complex (PIC) of Rakhmet Utesinov

- Stadium of Amin Tuyakov.
- Physical culture-improvements complex (PIC) of Rakhmet Utesinov.
- "Energetik" children-young mans sport school (CYSS).

== Transport ==
Zhanaozen is a terminal station at the railway connecting it to Gorgan (Zhanaozen — Gyzylgaya — Bereket — Gyzyletrek — Gorgan).

The city transport is presented by generally passenger "GAZelles" (12 routes, approx. 120 units) and private taxi. The cost of a passenger journey — 40 tenge (half price for children), and a taxi — 150-300 tenge.

== Famous residents ==
- Altynay Sapargalieva

== See also ==
- Railway stations in Kazakhstan
