= Kazakhstani Futsal Championship =

Sports league in Kazakhstan

- Founded: 1998
- Country: Kazakhstan; Kyrgyzstan (2009-2014)
- Confederation: UEFA
- Number of clubs: 11
- Level on pyramid: 1
- Domestic cup: Kazakhstan Futsal Cup
- International cup: UEFA Futsal Cup
- Current champions: AFC Kairat (2025–26)
- Most championships: AFC Kairat (22)
- Current: 2025–26

The Futsal Championship of Kazakhstan is the premier futsal league in Kazakhstan, organized by Football Federation of Kazakhstan.

== Seasons summary ==
Season	Champion	Runner-up	Third place	Best Player
1998-99	Stroitel	Temirlan	Bogatyr	
1999-00	Alibi	Kainur	Aktau	
2000-01	Alibi	Aktau	Rudny	
2001-02	Alibi	Aksauit	Zhigitter	
2002-03	Zhigitter	Tulpar	Kairat	(Kazakhstan) Bondarev (ZHG)
2003-04	Kairat	Tulpar	Aktoberentgen	(Kazakhstan) Bondarev (ZHG)
2004-05	Kairat	Tulpar	Aktoberentgen	
2005-06	Kairat	Tulpar	Tsementnik	(Brazil) Cacau (KRT)
2006-07	Kairat	Aktoberentgen	Alem	(Brazil) Cacau (KRT)
2007-08	Kairat	Aktoberentgen	Tsementnik	(Azerbaijan) Rafael Lira (KRT)
2008-09	Kairat	Aktoberentgen	Tulpar	(Kazakhstan) Suleimenov (AKT)
2009-10	Kairat	Tulpar	AsiaUniversalBank (Kyrgyzstan)	(Brazil) Kelson (KRT)
2010-11	Kairat	Tulpar	Rudny	(Kazakhstan) Suleimenov (KRT)
2011-12	Kairat	Tulpar	BTA Futsal	(Kazakhstan) Yesenamanov (TUL)
2012-13	Kairat	Tulpar	BTA Futsal	(Kazakhstan) Suleimenov (KRT)
2013-14	Kairat	Tulpar	Ayat	(Brazil) Joan (KRT)
2014-15	Kairat	Tulpar	Ayat	(Kazakhstan) Yesenamanov (TUL)
2015-16	Kairat	Ayat	Inzhu	(Brazil) Divanei (KRT)
2016-17	Kairat	Ayat	Aktobe	(Kazakhstan) Serik Zhamankulov (KRT)
2017-18	Kairat	Aktobe	Ayat	(Kazakhstan) Douglas Júnior (KRT)
2018-19	Kairat	Ayat	Jetisu	(Kazakhstan) Kairat Imanalin (AKT)
2019-20	Kairat	Aktobe	Ayat	
2020-21	Kairat	Aktobe	Atyrau	(Kazakhstan) Dauren Tursagulov (KRT)
2021-22	Kairat	Ayat	Atyrau	(Brazil) Thiago Cabeça (CAS)
2022-23	Kairat	Ayat	Aktobe	
2023-24	Semey	Kairat	Atyrau	(Brazil) Dedezinho (SEM)
2024-25	Kairat	Semey	Atyrau	
2025-26	Kairat	Semey	Aktobe	

== Teams 2024-2025 ==
- Aktobe
- Atyrau
- Ayat Rudny
- Bayterek
- Caspiy
- Jastar Taldykorgan
- Kairat Almaty
- Ordabasy Shymkent
- Semey
- Tulpar
- Zhigitter Astana
