= 2026–27 Swiss Futsal Cup =

Tournament details
- Country: Switzerland
- Dates: 15 November 2026 – 20 February 2027
- Teams: 23

Tournament statistics
- Matches played: 6
- Goals scored: 76 (12.67 per match)
- All statistics correct as of 15 November 2026. Goals scored in penalty shoot-outs not included.

The 2026–27 Swiss Futsal Cup will be the 5th edition of the Swiss Futsal Cup, the national cup competition for men's futsal in Switzerland. Futsal Minerva are the defending champions, having won each of the four previous editions.

== Teams ==
Division (Note: SFPL = Swiss Futsal Premier League SFSL = Swiss Futsal Second League)	Team	Round entered
SFSL	Ajax Fribourg Futsal	Round 1
SFPL	AS Charmilles	Round 2
SFPL	Bulle Futsal's	Round 1
SFPL	Empire Futsal Club Ebikon	Round 1
SFSL	FC Champel	Round 1
SFSL	FC Erlinsbach	Round 2
SFPL	FC Esperanza ZH	Round 2
SFSL	FC Forward-Morges	Round 2
SFSL	FC Genève United	Round 2
SFPL	FC Le Parc	Round 1
SFPL	FC Peseux Comète	Round 2
SFSL	FC Uster	Round 2
SFPL	Futsal Club Benfica	Round 1
SFSL	Futsal Club Gland	Round 1
SFSL	Futsal Golden Lions	Round 1
SFPL	Futsal Minerva	Round 1
SFSL	Jester 04 Baden	Round 1
SFSL	MBL Futsal	Round 1
SFPL	Mobulu Futsal Uni Bern	Round 2
SFSL	Olympique Basel Futsal	Round 1
SFSL	Racing Club ZH	Round 1
SFPL	Salines Futsal	Round 2
SFSL	SC Wipkingen ZH Futsal	Round 1

== Round 1 ==
The first round draw saw nine teams receive byes to the second round.

14 November 2026	Racing Club ZH	2–12	Futsal Club Benfica	Zürich
14:40	Ahmadi 6'; Kurath 32'	Report	Arpagaus 3', 21'; Silva 8', 24'; Castellon 10'; Silva 15', 16'; Lanzendorfer 18', 22', 30', 31'; Anjos 29'	Stadium: Sportzentrum Utogrund

14 November 2026	Jester 04 Baden	2–12	Futsal Minerva	Lenzburg
17:00	Jankovska 10'; Balaj 20'	Report	Oliveira 1', 9'; Costamanha 4'; Halimi 8'; Libiszewski 13'; Eleotério 20'; Kägi 27'; Leonaldi 28', 37', 39'; Soares 37', 40'	Stadium: Turnhalle Angelrain

14 November 2026	FC Le Parc	10–7 (a.e.t.)	SC Wipkingen ZH Futsal	La Chaux-de-Fonds
19:30	Rocha 13'; Gonzalez 23'; Aparicio 24', 34', 43'; Franciskumar 34' (o.g.); Piazzoni 37', 41', 42'; Paulo 46'	Report	Pereira 13'; Magliulo 16', 48'; Mabiongo 22', 38'; Bekkaye 38'; Colombo 40'	Stadium: Pavillon des sports

15 November 2026	FC Champel	0–3 (Note: Forfeit)	Bulle Futsal's

15 November 2026	Futsal Club Gland	6–0	Olympique Basel Futsal	Gland
15:00	Cunha 3'; Hinterberger 15'; Granjon 17', 28'; Murseli 18'; Azevedo 26'	Report		Stadium: Salle omnisports de Grand-Champ

15 November 2026	Empire Futsal Club Ebikon	13–2	Futsal Golden Lions	Lucerne
16:00	Figueiredo 1', 4', 25', 38', 38', 39'; Medeiros 8'; Spencer 10'; Yosief 12', 14'; Paz 13', 32'; Santos 22'	Report	Videa 5'; Marku 21'	Stadium: Sportanlage Littau Dorf

15 November 2026	Ajax Fribourg Futsal	6–4	MBL Futsal	Fribourg
18:00		Report		Stadium: Collège Sainte-Croix

All times are CET (UTC+1).
