= 2017–18 UEFA Futsal Cup =

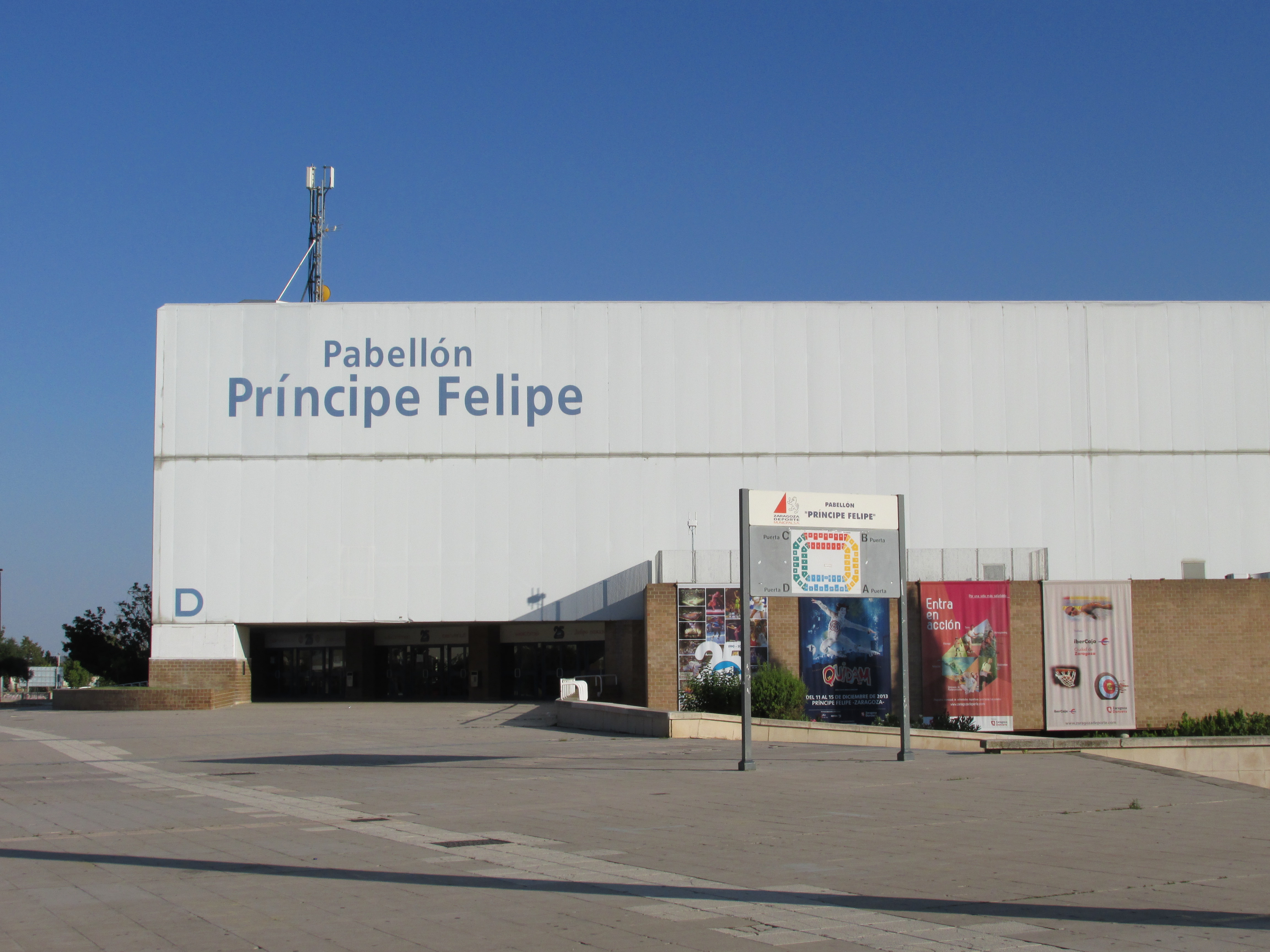
- The Pabellón Príncipe Felipe in Zaragoza hosted the final tournament

Tournament details
- Dates: Qualifying rounds: 23 August – 26 November 2017; Final tournament: 20–22 April 2018
- Teams: Final tournament: 4 Total: 56 (from 52 associations)

Final positions
- Champions: (Spain) Inter FS (5th title)
- Runners-up: (Portugal) Sporting CP
- Third place: (Spain) Barcelona
- Fourth place: (Hungary) Győri ETO

Tournament statistics
- Matches played: 124
- Goals scored: 879 (7.09 per match)
- Top scorer(s): Season total: (Albania) Halim Selmanaj (12 goals); Final tournament: (Russia) Leandro Esquerdinha (4 goals)

The 2017–18 UEFA Futsal Cup was the 32nd edition of Europe's premier club futsal tournament, and the 17th edition under the current UEFA Futsal Cup format organized by UEFA.

In a rematch of last season's final, defending champions Inter FS defeated Sporting CP to win a record fifth title to close out the UEFA Futsal Cup era, as starting from next season, the name of the tournament will be changed to the "UEFA Futsal Champions League". Barcelona defeated Győri ETO to finish third.

== Association team allocation ==
Starting from this season, the top three-ranked associations according to the UEFA Futsal National Team coefficient rankings can enter two teams. Moreover, same as previous seasons, the title holders qualify automatically, and thus their association can also enter a second team. If the title holders are from the top three-ranked associations, the fourth-ranked association can also enter two teams. All other associations can enter one team (the winners of their regular top domestic futsal league, or in special circumstances, the runners-up). Therefore, a maximum of 59 teams from the 55 UEFA member associations may enter the tournament.

=== Association ranking ===
For the 2017–18 UEFA Futsal Cup, the associations are allocated places according to their 2017–18 UEFA Futsal National Team coefficient rankings, calculated based on the following:

- UEFA Futsal Euro 2014 final tournament and qualifying competition
- UEFA Futsal Euro 2016 final tournament and qualifying competition
- 2016 FIFA Futsal World Cup final tournament and qualifying competition

Since the winners of the 2016–17 UEFA Futsal Cup, Inter FS, are from the top three-ranked associations, the fourth-ranked association can also enter two teams.

| Rank | Association | Coeff. | Teams |
|---|---|---|---|
| 1 | Russia | 10,605 | 2 |
| 2 | Spain | 10,017 | 2 |
| 3 | Portugal | 9,250 | 2 |
| 4 | Italy | 8,889 | 2 |
| 5 | Ukraine | 7,944 | 1 |
| 6 | Azerbaijan | 7,544 | 1 |
| 7 | Slovenia | 6,389 | 1 |
| 8 | Kazakhstan | 6,333 | 1 |
| 9 | Serbia | 5,556 | 1 |
| 10 | Croatia | 5,556 | 1 |
| 11 | (Czech Republic) Czech Republic | 4,667 | 1 |
| 12 | Romania | 4,278 | 1 |
| 13 | Hungary | 4,222 | 1 |
| 14 | Slovakia | 3,389 | 1 |
| 15 | Netherlands | 3,333 | 1 |
| 16 | Belgium | 3,278 | 1 |
| 17 | (Bosnia and Herzegovina) Bosnia and Herzegovina | 3,000 | 1 |
| 18 | Belarus | 2,667 | 1 |
| 19 | Poland | 2,056 | 1 |

| Rank | Association | Coeff. | Teams |
|---|---|---|---|
| 20 | (North Macedonia) Macedonia | 2,000 | 1 |
| 21 | Finland | 1,583 | 1 |
| 22 | Turkey | 1,444 | 1 |
| 23 | France | 1,278 | 1 |
| 24 | Latvia | 1,222 | 1 |
| 25 | (Georgia (country)) Georgia | 1,028 | 1 |
| 26 | Norway | 1,000 | 1 |
| 27 | Sweden | 0,944 | 1 |
| 28 | England | 0,944 | 1 |
| 29 | Greece | 0,889 | 1 |
| 30 | Moldova | 0,750 | 1 |
| 31 | Denmark | 0,722 | 1 |
| 32 | Montenegro | 0,667 | 1 |
| 33 | Bulgaria | 0,611 | 1 |
| 34 | Switzerland | 0,472 | 1 |
| 35 | Armenia | 0,444 | 1 |
| 36 | Andorra | 0,389 | 1 |
| 37 | Lithuania | 0,389 | 1 |

| Rank | Association | Coeff. | Teams |
|---|---|---|---|
| 38 | Albania | 0,333 | 1 |
| 39 | Israel | 0,333 | 1 |
| 40 | Cyprus | 0,222 | 1 |
| 41 | Wales | 0,222 | 1 |
| 42 | Estonia | 0,111 | 1 |
| 43 | Gibraltar | 0,111 | 1 |
| 44 | Malta | 0,000 | 1 |
| 45 | (San Marino) San Marino | 0,000 | 1 |
| 46 | Scotland | 0,000 | 1 |
| (NR) | Germany | 0.000 | 1 |
| (NR) | Kosovo | 0.000 | 1 |
| (NR) | Austria | 0.000 | 1 |
| (NR) | Luxembourg | 0.000 | 1 |
| (NR) | (Northern Ireland) Northern Ireland | 0.000 | 1 |
| (NR) | (Republic of Ireland) Republic of Ireland | 0.000 | 1 |
| (NR) | (Faroe Islands) Faroe Islands | 0.000 | 0 (DNE) |
| (NR) | Iceland | 0.000 | 0 (DNE) |
| (NR) | Liechtenstein | 0.000 | 0 (DNE) |

Notes

- (TH) – Additional berth for title holders
- (DNE) – Did not enter
- (NR) – No rank (association did not enter in the competitions used for computing coefficients)

=== Distribution ===
Following expansion of the tournament, the top-ranked teams no longer receive byes to the elite round, and the number of teams in the main round is increased from 24 to 32. Teams are ranked according to their UEFA club coefficients, computed based on results of the last three seasons, to decide on the round they enter and their seeding positions in the preliminary and main round draws:

- The title holders and the teams ranked 1–22 or 23 (depending on the number of entries) enter the main round, divided into Path A and Path B.
  - Path A contains the title holders and the teams ranked 1–11 and 16–19, and the 16 teams are drawn into four groups of four. The top three teams of each group advance to the elite round.
  - Path B contains the teams ranked 12–15 and 20–22 or 23, and together with the preliminary round qualifiers (8 or 9 teams), the 16 teams are drawn into four groups of four. The winners of each group advance to the elite round.
- The remaining teams enter the preliminary round, and are drawn into groups of three or four. The winners of each group plus one or more best runners-up advance to main round Path B.

The elite round remains to be contested by 16 teams, drawn into four groups of four, where the group winners and runners-up from main round Path A are seeded into the top two pots and kept apart if they are from the same group. The winners of each group advance to the final tournament, which is played in the same knockout format as before.

=== Teams ===
A record total of 56 teams from 52 associations entered this season's competition. Two associations had no league as of 2016–17 (Faroe Islands, Liechtenstein). The champions of Iceland (UMF Selfoss) did not enter. Northern Ireland launched a futsal league in 2016, and entered for the first time, with their entrant to be confirmed after the draw in July 2017.

Among the entrants, 24 teams entered the main round and 32 teams entered the preliminary round. The hosts for the eight preliminary round groups and the eight main round groups were announced by UEFA on 20 June 2017.

Legend

- TH: Futsal Cup title holders
- CH: National champions
- RU: National runners-up
- (H): Preliminary and main round hosts

Main round
| Rank | Team | Coeff. | Path | Seed |
|---|---|---|---|---|
| TH | (Spain) Inter FS (CH) | 57,000 | A | 1 |
| 1 | (Kazakhstan) Kairat Almaty (CH) | 45,500 | A | 1 |
| 2 | (Portugal) Sporting CP (CH) | 38,166 | A | 1 |
| 3 | (Spain) Barcelona (RU) | 37,667 | A | 1 |
| 4 | (Russia) Dina Moskva (RU) | 28,334 | A | 2 |
| 5 | (Russia) Dinamo Moskva (CH) | 25,001 | A | 2 |
| 6 | (Czech Republic) EP Chrudim (CH) | 19,502 | A | 2 |
| 7 | (Serbia) Ekonomac (CH) (H) | 19,001 | A | 2 |
| 8 | (Latvia) Nikars Riga (CH) | 16,500 | A | 3 |
| 9 | (Italy) Pescara (RU) | 16,500 | A | 3 |
| 10 | (Portugal) Braga/AAUM (RU) | 15,833 | A | 3 |
| 11 | (Hungary) Győri ETO (CH) | 14,168 | A | 3 |
| 12 | (Slovakia) Slov-Matic Bratislava (CH) (H) | 14,000 | B | 1 |
| 13 | (Azerbaijan) Araz Naxçivan (CH) | 13,001 | B | 1 |
| 14 | (Belgium) Halle-Gooik (CH) | 11,000 | B | 1 |
| 15 | (Croatia) Nacional Zagreb (CH) (H) | 10,001 | B | 1 |
| 16 | (Italy) Luparense (CH) (H) | 9,167 | A | 4 |
| 17 | (Slovenia) Brezje Maribor (CH) (H) | 7,833 | A | 4 |
| 18 | (Belarus) Stalitsa Minsk (CH) (H) | 6,001 | A | 4 |
| 19 | (Ukraine) Prodexim Kherson (CH) | 5,501 | A | 4 |
| 20 | (France) Garges Djibson (CH) | 5,167 | B | 2 |
| 21 | (Romania) Autobergamo Deva (CH) (H) | 4,834 | B | 2 |
| 22 | (Finland) Sievi Futsal (CH) (H) | 4,834 | B | 2 |
| 23 | (Georgia (country)) STU Telasi (CH) | 4,168 | B | 2 |

Preliminary round
| Rank | Team | Coeff. | Seed |
|---|---|---|---|
| 24 | (North Macedonia) Shkupi (CH) | 3,334 | 1 |
| 25 | (Bulgaria) Levski Sofia Zapad (CH) | 2,875 | 1 |
| 26 | (England) Helvécia (CH) | 2,834 | 1 |
| 27 | (Poland) BTS Rekord Bielsko-Biała (CH) | 2,501 | 1 |
| 28 | (Cyprus) Anorthosis Famagusta (CH) (H) | 2,500 | 1 |
| 29 | (Germany) Jahn Regensburg (CH) | 2,084 | 1 |
| 30 | (Albania) Flamurtari Vlorë (CH) | 1,751 | 1 |
| 31 | (Kosovo) Liburni Gjakovë (CH) | 1,667 | 1 |
| 32 | (Montenegro) Titograd (CH) | 1,584 | 2 |
| 33 | (Netherlands) ZVV 't Knooppunt (CH) | 1,500 | 2 |
| 34 | (Greece) Doukas SAC (CH) | 1,500 | 2 |
| 35 | (Moldova) Classic Chişinău (CH) | 1,375 | 2 |
| 36 | (Bosnia and Herzegovina) Mostar SG Staklorad (CH) (H) | 1,334 | 2 |
| 37 | (Sweden) IFK Uddevalla (CH) (H) | 1,167 | 2 |
| 38 | (Malta) Luxol St Andrews (CH) | 1,167 | 2 |
| 39 | (Gibraltar) Lynx (CH) | 0,834 | 2 |
| 40 | (Norway) Sjarmtrollan IL (CH) (H) | 0,667 | 3 |
| 41 | (Denmark) København (CH) (H) | 0,584 | 3 |
| 42 | (Armenia) Leo (CH) | 0,584 | 3 |
| 43 | (Republic of Ireland) Transylvania (CH) | 0,584 | 3 |
| 44 | (Andorra) Encamp (CH) | 0,500 | 3 |
| 45 | (Lithuania) Vytis (CH) | 0,500 | 3 |
| 46 | (Austria) Diamantz Linz (CH) (H) | 0,500 | 3 |
| 47 | (Turkey) Arnavutköy Belediyespor (CH) | 0,500 | 3 |
| 48 | (Israel) Maccabi Futsal (CH) | 0,417 | 4 |
| 49 | (San Marino) Tre Fiori (CH) | 0,251 | 4 |
| 50 | (Estonia) Narva United (CH) | 0,250 | 4 |
| 51 | (Luxembourg) Differdange 03 (CH) (H) | 0,167 | 4 |
| 52 | (Wales) Wrexham (CH) | 0,084 | 4 |
| 53 | (Switzerland) Minerva (CH) (H) | 0,000 | 4 |
| 54 | (Scotland) TMT Futsal Club (CH) | 0,000 | 4 |
| 55 | (Northern Ireland) Belfast United (CH) | 0,000 | 4 |

The draws for the preliminary and main rounds were held on 6 July 2017, 14:00 CEST, at the UEFA headquarters in Nyon, Switzerland. The mechanism of the draws for each round was as follows:

- In the preliminary round, the 32 teams were drawn into eight groups of four containing one team from each of the seeding positions 1–4. First, the eight teams which were pre-selected as hosts were drawn from their own designated pot and allocated to their respective group as per their seeding positions. Next, the remaining 24 teams were drawn from their respective pot which were allocated according to their seeding positions.
- In the main round Path A, the 16 teams were drawn into four groups of four containing one team from each of the seeding positions 1–4. First, the four teams which were pre-selected as hosts were drawn from their own designated pot and allocated to their respective group as per their seeding positions. Next, the remaining 12 teams were drawn from their respective pot which were allocated according to their seeding positions. Teams from the same association could be drawn against each other.
- In the main round Path B, the 16 teams were drawn into four groups of four containing one team from each of the seeding positions 1–2 and two group winners from the preliminary round. First, the four teams which were pre-selected as hosts were drawn from their own designated pot and allocated to their respective group as per their seeding positions. Next, the remaining 12 teams were drawn from their respective pot which were allocated according to their seeding positions, including the eight group winners from the preliminary round whose identity was not known at the time of the draw, which were first allocated to fill position 4 of all groups before position 3.

Based on the decisions taken by the UEFA Emergency Panel, teams from Azerbaijan/Armenia and Kosovo/Bosnia and Herzegovina would not be drawn into the same group. Should any of the above teams win their preliminary round group and qualify for a main round group with a team they cannot play against, they would be swapped with the next available team in their seeding position following the numerical order of the groups.

== Round and draw dates ==
The schedule of the competition is as follows.

| Round | Draw | Dates |
|---|---|---|
| Preliminary round | 6 July 2017 | 22–27 August 2017 |
| Main round | 6 July 2017 | 10–15 October 2017 |
| Elite round | 19 October 2017 | 21–26 November 2017 |
| Final tournament | 14 March 2018 | Semi-finals: 20 April 2018; Third place match & Final: 22 April 2018 |

In the preliminary round, main round and elite round, the schedule of each mini-tournament is as follows (Regulations Article 19.05):

Note: For scheduling, the hosts are considered as Team 1, while the visiting teams are considered as Team 2, Team 3, and Team 4 according to their coefficient rankings.

| Matchday | Matches |
|---|---|
| Matchday 1 | 2 v 4, 1 v 3 |
| Matchday 2 | 3 v 2, 1 v 4 |
| Rest day | — |
| Matchday 3 | 4 v 3, 2 v 1 |

== Format ==
In the preliminary round, main round, and elite round, each group is played as a round-robin mini-tournament at the pre-selected hosts.

In the final tournament, the four qualified teams play in knockout format (semi-finals, third place match, and final), either at a host selected by UEFA from one of the teams, or at a neutral venue.

=== Tiebreakers ===
In the preliminary round, main round, and elite round, teams are ranked according to points (3 points for a win, 1 point for a draw, 0 points for a loss), and if tied on points, the following tiebreaking criteria are applied, in the order given, to determine the rankings (Regulations Articles 14.01 and 14.02):

1. Points in head-to-head matches among tied teams;
2. Goal difference in head-to-head matches among tied teams;
3. Goals scored in head-to-head matches among tied teams;
4. If more than two teams are tied, and after applying all head-to-head criteria above, a subset of teams are still tied, all head-to-head criteria above are reapplied exclusively to this subset of teams;
5. Goal difference in all group matches;
6. Goals scored in all group matches;
7. Penalty shoot-out if only two teams have the same number of points, and they met in the last round of the group and are tied after applying all criteria above (not used if more than two teams have the same number of points, or if their rankings are not relevant for qualification for the next stage);
8. Disciplinary points (red card = 3 points, yellow card = 1 point, expulsion for two yellow cards in one match = 3 points);
9. UEFA club coefficient;
10. Drawing of lots.

== Preliminary round ==
The winners of each group advanced to the main round path B to join the eight teams which received byes to the main round path B (while the remaining 16 teams received byes to the main round Path A).

All times are CEST (UTC+2).

=== Group A ===
| Pos | Team | Pld | W | D | L | GF | GA | GD | Pts | Qualification |
|---|---|---|---|---|---|---|---|---|---|---|
| 1 | (Switzerland) Minerva (H) | 3 | 3 | 0 | 0 | 11 | 4 | +7 | 9 | Main round |
| 2 | (England) Helvécia | 3 | 2 | 0 | 1 | 14 | 5 | +9 | 6 | |
| 3 | (Gibraltar) Lynx | 3 | 0 | 1 | 2 | 6 | 14 | −8 | 1 | |
| 4 | (Republic of Ireland) Transylvania | 3 | 0 | 1 | 2 | 6 | 14 | −8 | 1 | |

Source: UEFA
Rules for classification: Tiebreakers
(H) Hosts
23 August 2017
17:15

| Helvécia (England) | 7–0 | (Republic of Ireland) Transylvania |
|---|---|---|
| Monti 2:48, 5:50, 37:20; Webb 18:26; Derendiajev 26:08; Lucas Ferras 33:59; Raoni Medina 38:13 | Report |

Sporthalle Weissenstein, Bern
Referee: Andrej Topić (Croatia), Irina Velikanova (Russia)
23 August 2017
19:45

| Minerva (Switzerland) | 4–1 | (Gibraltar) Lynx |
|---|---|---|
| Machado 2:51; Buckson 3:43, 25:06; Soares 24:09 | Report | Martin 12:25 |

Sporthalle Weissenstein, Bern
Referee: Josip Barton (Macedonia), Šarūnas Tamulynas (Lithuania)

24 August 2017
17:15

| Lynx (Gibraltar) | 1–6 | (England) Helvécia |
|---|---|---|
| Derendiajev 20:15 (og) | Report | Goldstein 9:54; Andrew De Santana 23:49; Palfreeman 33:07; Monti 33:36; Webb 34:37 (d.p); Dickson 39:03 (d.p) |

Sporthalle Weissenstein, Bern
Referee: Šarūnas Tamulynas (Lithuania), Andrej Topić (Croatia)
24 August 2017
19:45

| Minerva (Switzerland) | 3–2 | (Republic of Ireland) Transylvania |
|---|---|---|
| Soares 16:49 (d.p); Balvis 21:40; Buckson 27:11 | Report | Galo 5:36; Stancuta 36:28 |

Sporthalle Weissenstein, Bern
Referee: Irina Velikanova (Russia), Josip Barton (Macedonia)

26 August 2017
14:00

| Transylvania (Republic of Ireland) | 4–4 | (Gibraltar) Lynx |
|---|---|---|
| Byrne 2:19; De Paula 33:41, 35:14; Stancuta 39:46 | Report | Carmona 3:47, 26:09; Cancio 19:35; Martin 36:53 |

Sporthalle Weissenstein, Bern
Referee: Irina Velikanova (Russia), Šarūnas Tamulynas (Lithuania)
26 August 2017
16:30

| Helvécia (England) | 1–4 | (Switzerland) Minerva |
|---|---|---|
| Gonzales Rodriguez 8:17 | Report | Machado 28:28; Mezger 29:04; Buckson 30:56; Maksutaj 37:25 |

Sporthalle Weissenstein, Bern
Referee: Andrej Topić (Croatia), Josip Barton (Macedonia)

=== Group B ===
| Pos | Team | Pld | W | D | L | GF | GA | GD | Pts | Qualification |
|---|---|---|---|---|---|---|---|---|---|---|
| 1 | (Kosovo) Liburni Gjakovë | 3 | 3 | 0 | 0 | 20 | 7 | +13 | 9 | Main round |
| 2 | (Montenegro) Titograd | 3 | 2 | 0 | 1 | 10 | 11 | −1 | 6 | |
| 3 | (Lithuania) Vytis | 3 | 0 | 1 | 2 | 8 | 13 | −5 | 1 | |
| 4 | (Luxembourg) Differdange 03 (H) | 3 | 0 | 1 | 2 | 7 | 14 | −7 | 1 | |

Source: UEFA
Rules for classification: Tiebreakers
(H) Hosts
23 August 2017
18:00

| Liburni Gjakovë (Kosovo) | 7–3 | (Lithuania) Vytis |
|---|---|---|
| Selimi 0:23; Alaj 3:10; Selmanaj 11:02, 23:39, 37:20; A. Brahimi 35:52; Qerimi 39:26 | Report | Luiz Da Silva Nascimento 9:14, 39:05; Genigle 29:40 |

Centre Sportif Oberkorn, Oberkorn
Referee: Patrik Porkert (Austria), Ovidiu Dan Curta (Romania)
23 August 2017
20:30

| Differdange 03 (Luxembourg) | 2–5 | (Montenegro) Titograd |
|---|---|---|
| Zezinho 36:39; Robinho 39:54 | Report | Drašković 26:57, 39:44; M. Bajčetić 30:18; Barović 34:14; Mugoša 39:06 |

Centre Sportif Oberkorn, Oberkorn
Referee: Moshe Bohbot (Israel), Grigori Ošomkov (Estonia)

24 August 2017
18:00

| Titograd (Montenegro) | 2–7 | (Kosovo) Liburni Gjakovë |
|---|---|---|
| Mugoša 2:57; Vukšanović 34:10 | Report | Selimi 5:24; A. Brahimi 19:35, 40:00; Brovina 21:17; Selmanaj 23:51, 33:57; Kasapi 24:36 |

Centre Sportif Oberkorn, Oberkorn
Referee: Grigori Ošomkov (Estonia), Patrik Porkert (Austria)
24 August 2017
20:30

| Differdange 03 (Luxembourg) | 3–3 | (Lithuania) Vytis |
|---|---|---|
| Antonio Abreu 10:51 (p); Ricardo Barros 39:18; Dany Vieira 39:48 | Report | Klebert Ferreira 9:58, 38:07; Afrânio 14:59 |

Centre Sportif Oberkorn, Oberkorn
Referee: Ovidiu Dan Curta (Romania), Moshe Bohbot (Israel)

26 August 2017
18:00

| Vytis (Lithuania) | 2–3 | (Montenegro) Titograd |
|---|---|---|
| Guesinho Genigle 1:17; Barović 16:16 (og) | Report | Drašković 1:36; Gojković 28:02; Mugoša 30:17 |

Centre Sportif Oberkorn, Oberkorn
Referee: Moshe Bohbot (Israel), Ovidiu Dan Curta (Romania)
26 August 2017
20:30

| Liburni Gjakovë (Kosovo) | 6–2 | (Luxembourg) Differdange 03 |
|---|---|---|
| Brovina 9:54; Kasapi 21:20; Selmanaj 22:32, 25:06, 38:36; Dobroshi 37:57 | Report | Antonio Abreu 11:55; Zezinho 36:31 |

Centre Sportif Oberkorn, Oberkorn
Referee: Patrik Porkert (Austria), Grigori Ošomkov (Estonia)

=== Group C ===
| Pos | Team | Pld | W | D | L | GF | GA | GD | Pts | Qualification |
|---|---|---|---|---|---|---|---|---|---|---|
| 1 | (Malta) Luxol St Andrews | 3 | 3 | 0 | 0 | 20 | 6 | +14 | 9 | Main round |
| 2 | (North Macedonia) Shkupi | 3 | 2 | 0 | 1 | 15 | 15 | 0 | 6 | |
| 3 | (Israel) Maccabi Futsal | 3 | 1 | 0 | 2 | 7 | 10 | −3 | 3 | |
| 4 | (Austria) Diamantz Linz (H) | 3 | 0 | 0 | 3 | 7 | 18 | −11 | 0 | |

Source: UEFA
Rules for classification: Tiebreakers
(H) Hosts
23 August 2017
18:00

| Shkupi (North Macedonia) | 5–1 | (Israel) Maccabi Futsal |
|---|---|---|
| Alimi 3:57; Nezir 26:21; Seferi 30:11; Ibiši 39:10, 39:51 | Report | T. Shkolnik 2:48 |

Sporthalle Europagymnasium Linz-Auhof, Linz
Referee: Hennadiy Hora (Ukraine), Daniele D'adamo (San Marino)
23 August 2017
20:15

| Diamantz Linz (Austria) | 1–7 | (Malta) Luxol St Andrews |
|---|---|---|
| Stankovic 38:10 | Report | Rogerinho 1:00; Zammit 8:41; Răducu 13:03; Perković 16:42, 39:49; Celino Alves 23:10; Sammut 34:12 |

Sporthalle Europagymnasium Linz-Auhof, Linz
Referee: Lukáš Peško (Slovakia), Besar Beqiri (Kosovo)

24 August 2017
18:00

| Luxol St Andrews (Malta) | 9–2 | (North Macedonia) Shkupi |
|---|---|---|
| Celino Alves 0:52, 15:58; Grbeša 7:59, 33:18 (d.p); Răducu 16:25; Penava 17:24; Perković 26:44; Vuković 37:13, 38:11 | Report | Seferi 14:34; Petrović 31:30 |

Sporthalle Europagymnasium Linz-Auhof, Linz
Referee: Besar Beqiri (Kosovo), Hennadiy Hora (Ukraine)
24 August 2017
20:15

| Diamantz Linz (Austria) | 1–3 | (Israel) Maccabi Futsal |
|---|---|---|
| Kismetovic 37:35 | Report | Osadon 10:28; Diedunov 33:51; Cohen 35:36 |

Sporthalle Europagymnasium Linz-Auhof, Linz
Referee: Daniele D'adamo (San Marino), Lukáš Peško (Slovakia)

26 August 2017
18:00

| Maccabi Futsal (Israel) | 3–4 | (Malta) Luxol St Andrews |
|---|---|---|
| Cohen 9:58, 29:17; Diedunov 22:32 | Report | Grbeša 2:29; Vuković 4:20; Zammit 8:42; Perković 28:06 |

Sporthalle Europagymnasium Linz-Auhof, Linz
Referee: Lukáš Peško (Slovakia), Besar Beqiri (Kosovo)
26 August 2017
20:15

| Shkupi (North Macedonia) | 8–5 | (Austria) Diamantz Linz |
|---|---|---|
| Seferi 2:13, 19:12, 39:04, 39:36; Fazliu 3:42; Jakupi 7:38; Petrović 13:09; Sotirovski 33:34 | Report | Skrgic 3:55; Stankovic 10:56; Dzinic 14:53; Husic 16:34, 17:11 |

Sporthalle Europagymnasium Linz-Auhof, Linz
Referee: Hennadiy Hora (Ukraine), Daniele D'adamo (San Marino)

=== Group D ===
| Pos | Team | Pld | W | D | L | GF | GA | GD | Pts | Qualification |
|---|---|---|---|---|---|---|---|---|---|---|
| 1 | (Germany) Jahn Regensburg | 3 | 3 | 0 | 0 | 16 | 2 | +14 | 9 | Main round |
| 2 | (Sweden) IFK Uddevalla (H) | 3 | 2 | 0 | 1 | 13 | 4 | +9 | 6 | |
| 3 | (Andorra) Encamp | 3 | 0 | 1 | 2 | 2 | 10 | −8 | 1 | |
| 4 | (San Marino) Tre Fiori | 3 | 0 | 1 | 2 | 2 | 17 | −15 | 1 | |

Source: UEFA
Rules for classification: Tiebreakers
(H) Hosts
23 August 2017
17:00

| Jahn Regensburg (Germany) | 8–1 | (San Marino) Tre Fiori |
|---|---|---|
| Guilherme 1:36, 1:49; Alemão 4:32, 16:47, 26:23, 39:42; Andrezinho 25:13; Andre Caro 33:58 | Report | Bugli 11:14 |

Agnebergshallen, Uddevalla
Referee: Veljko Bošković (Montenegro), Daniel Matkovic (Switzerland)
23 August 2017
19:30

| IFK Uddevalla (Sweden) | 4–1 | (Andorra) Encamp |
|---|---|---|
| Berisha 3:14; Bagger 10:21, 37:54; Nashabat 31:21 | Report | Mesquita 17:20 |

Agnebergshallen, Uddevalla
Referee: Vasilios Christodoulis (Greece), Matthew Vella (Malta)

24 August 2017
17:00

| Encamp (Andorra) | 0–5 | (Germany) Jahn Regensburg |
|---|---|---|
| | Report | Guilherme 16:19; Alemão 16:31, 34:51; Andre Caro 28:10; Andrezinho 33:44 |

Agnebergshallen, Uddevalla
Referee: Matthew Vella (Malta), Veljko Bošković (Montenegro)
24 August 2017
19:30

| IFK Uddevalla (Sweden) | 8–0 | (San Marino) Tre Fiori |
|---|---|---|
| Sadriu 5:22; Gashi 8:17; Bagger 8:59, 36:40; Berisha 9:33, 13:05; Hiseni 39:02, 39:29 | Report |

Agnebergshallen, Uddevalla
Referee: Daniel Matkovic (Switzerland), Vasilios Christodoulis (Greece)

26 August 2017
14:00

| Tre Fiori (San Marino) | 1–1 | (Andorra) Encamp |
|---|---|---|
| Santi 38:18 | Report | Mesquita 17:53 |

Agnebergshallen, Uddevalla
Referee: Daniel Matkovic (Switzerland), Matthew Vella (Malta)
26 August 2017
16:30

| Jahn Regensburg (Germany) | 3–1 | (Sweden) IFK Uddevalla |
|---|---|---|
| Guilherme 26:04, 35:12; Alemão 33:56 | Report | Zhubi 19:51 |

Agnebergshallen, Uddevalla
Referee: Veljko Bošković (Montenegro), Vasilios Christodoulis (Greece)

=== Group E ===
| Pos | Team | Pld | W | D | L | GF | GA | GD | Pts | Qualification |
|---|---|---|---|---|---|---|---|---|---|---|
| 1 | (Bosnia and Herzegovina) Mostar SG Staklorad (H) | 3 | 3 | 0 | 0 | 32 | 6 | +26 | 9 | Main round |
| 2 | (Turkey) Arnavutköy Belediyespor | 3 | 2 | 0 | 1 | 23 | 10 | +13 | 6 | |
| 3 | (Estonia) Narva United | 3 | 1 | 0 | 2 | 8 | 24 | −16 | 3 | |
| 4 | (Albania) Flamurtari Vlorë | 3 | 0 | 0 | 3 | 5 | 28 | −23 | 0 | |

Source: UEFA
Rules for classification: Tiebreakers
(H) Hosts
23 August 2017
19:00

| Flamurtari Vlorë (Albania) | 3–4 | (Estonia) Narva United |
|---|---|---|
| Kaca 29:57; Guna 39:06; Gurzaković 39:56 | Report | Bader 19:54, 32:48; Bõstrov 21:27; Akulenko 29:05 |

USRC Midhat Hujdur Hujka, Mostar
Referee: Miguel Castilho (Portugal), Dejan Veselič (Slovenia)
23 August 2017
21:15

| Mostar SG Staklorad (Bosnia and Herzegovina) | 7–3 | (Turkey) Arnavutköy Belediyespor |
|---|---|---|
| Aladžić 4:19, 31:38; Bošković 9:54; Kahvedžić 18:25, 19:06, 29:51; Vesić 24:33 | Report | Muhammet Altunay 4:50; Onur Mengi 14:55; Burak Özdemir 15:11 |

USRC Midhat Hujdur Hujka, Mostar
Referee: Gerd Bylois (Belgium), Gerard Roure Ramirez (Andorra)

24 August 2017
19:00

| Arnavutköy Belediyespor (Turkey) | 12–2 | (Albania) Flamurtari Vlorë |
|---|---|---|
| Yiğitcan Yenilmez 5:28; Onur Mengi 6:00, 27:05, 28:53; Burak Özdemir 8:09; Talha Can Vardar 16:41, 21:50; Sait Yayla 19:05; Ferhat Aşik 27:51, 38:55; Muhammet Altunay 35:49, 37:43 | Report | Gokaj 0:36; Kaca 2:39 |

USRC Midhat Hujdur Hujka, Mostar
Referee: Gerard Roure Ramirez (Andorra), Miguel Castilho (Portugal)
24 August 2017
21:15

| Mostar SG Staklorad (Bosnia and Herzegovina) | 13–3 | (Estonia) Narva United |
|---|---|---|
| Dandan 0:46, 15:52, 23:54; Aladžić 4:08, 17:02, 36:35; Vesić 7:15, 16:11; Bošković 17:24; Radmilović 21:19; Šikalo 29:09; Pavlović 30:05, 30:53 | Report | Akulenko 16:32 (p), 32:31; Bader 32:00 |

USRC Midhat Hujdur Hujka, Mostar
Referee: Dejan Veselič (Slovenia), Gerd Bylois (Belgium)

26 August 2017
19:00

| Narva United (Estonia) | 1–8 | (Turkey) Arnavutköy Belediyespor |
|---|---|---|
| Bõstrov 36:46 | Report | Muhammet Altunay 3:21, 33:27, 35:39; Enes Bayraktar 8:15; Talha Can Vardar 17:20, 23:07; Burak Özdemir 19:42; Onur Mengi 24:56 |

USRC Midhat Hujdur Hujka, Mostar
Referee: Miguel Castilho (Portugal), Gerd Bylois (Belgium)
26 August 2017
21:15

| Flamurtari Vlorë (Albania) | 0–12 | (Bosnia and Herzegovina) Mostar SG Staklorad |
|---|---|---|
| | Report | Dandan 1:23, 21:24, 22:31; Kahvedžić 7:44, 22:00; Aladžić 10:09; Bošković 11:11, 14:11, 32:01; Hrkać 18:37; Vesić 19:13; Radmilović 29:31 |

USRC Midhat Hujdur Hujka, Mostar
Referee: Dejan Veselič (Slovenia), Gerard Roure Ramirez (Andorra)

=== Group F ===
| Pos | Team | Pld | W | D | L | GF | GA | GD | Pts | Qualification |
|---|---|---|---|---|---|---|---|---|---|---|
| 1 | (Armenia) Leo | 3 | 3 | 0 | 0 | 15 | 2 | +13 | 9 | Main round |
| 2 | (Cyprus) Anorthosis Famagusta (H) | 3 | 2 | 0 | 1 | 18 | 11 | +7 | 6 | |
| 3 | (Moldova) Classic Chişinău | 3 | 1 | 0 | 2 | 9 | 21 | −12 | 3 | |
| 4 | (Wales) Wrexham | 3 | 0 | 0 | 3 | 9 | 17 | −8 | 0 | |

Source: UEFA
Rules for classification: Tiebreakers
(H) Hosts
23 August 2017
15:30

| Classic Chişinău (Moldova) | 7–4 | (Wales) Wrexham |
|---|---|---|
| Nicolaiciuc 2:22, 36:41, 39:07; Negara 4:42, 13:00, 20:33, 35:25 | Report | Rogers 3:16, 5:50, 14:49; Chitoroagî 8:43 (og) |

Kitio Sports Hall, Larnaca
Referee: Iurii Neverov (Russia), David Glavonjic (Sweden)
23 August 2017
18:30

| Anorthosis Famagusta (Cyprus) | 1–5 | (Armenia) Leo |
|---|---|---|
| Christofi 32:33 | Report | Karapetyan 15:43; Dokmanyan 25:50; Loginov 38:37; Mashumyan 38:54, 39:07 |

Kitio Sports Hall, Larnaca
Referee: Barry Weijers (Netherlands), Zyl Robert Fred Sheriff (Gibraltar)

24 August 2017
15:30

| Anorthosis Famagusta (Cyprus) | 7–4 | (Wales) Wrexham |
|---|---|---|
| Cristian Magno 14:57; Kouloumbris 15:14; Kokkinos 19:22; Felipinho 28:49, 35:19, 37:50; Arsan 29:41 (og) | Report | Panagi 0:13 (og); Pritchard 17:52; M. Williams 18:39; Rogers 25:26 |

Kitio Sports Hall, Larnaca
Referee: David Glavonjic (Sweden), Barry Weijers (Netherlands)
24 August 2017
18:30

| Leo (Armenia) | 7–0 | (Moldova) Classic Chişinău |
|---|---|---|
| Vardanyan 5:38; Radovanović 15:03, 16:48, 17:54, 23:21; Martirosyan-Friesen 37:44; Sargsyan 39:32 | Report |

Kitio Sports Hall, Larnaca
Referee: Zyl Robert Fred Sheriff (Gibraltar), Iurii Neverov (Russia)

26 August 2017
15:30

| Wrexham (Wales) | 1–3 | (Armenia) Leo |
|---|---|---|
| Hesp 6:44 | Report | Vardanyan 17:22; Sargsyan 21:46, 36:29 |

Kitio Sports Hall, Larnaca
Referee: Zyl Robert Fred Sheriff (Gibraltar), David Glavonjic (Sweden)
26 August 2017
18:30

| Classic Chişinău (Moldova) | 2–10 | (Cyprus) Anorthosis Famagusta |
|---|---|---|
| Negara 7:25; Ciopa 16:57 | Report | Felipinho 0:40, 26:53; Kouppari 5:50, 19:29, 27:23; Kouloumbris 15:40, 22:41, 28:25; Panagi 38:41 (p), 39:37 |

Kitio Sports Hall, Larnaca
Referee: Barry Weijers (Netherlands), Iurii Neverov (Russia)

=== Group G ===
| Pos | Team | Pld | W | D | L | GF | GA | GD | Pts | Qualification |
|---|---|---|---|---|---|---|---|---|---|---|
| 1 | (Poland) BTS Rekord Bielsko-Biała | 3 | 3 | 0 | 0 | 30 | 6 | +24 | 9 | Main round |
| 2 | (Denmark) København (H) | 3 | 2 | 0 | 1 | 18 | 15 | +3 | 6 | |
| 3 | (Greece) Doukas SAC | 3 | 1 | 0 | 2 | 9 | 11 | −2 | 3 | |
| 4 | (Northern Ireland) Belfast United | 3 | 0 | 0 | 3 | 11 | 36 | −25 | 0 | |

Source: UEFA
Rules for classification: Tiebreakers
(H) Hosts
23 August 2017
12:00

| BTS Rekord Bielsko-Biała (Poland) | 20–3 | (Northern Ireland) Belfast United |
|---|---|---|
| Seidler 1:14, 1:18, 8:01; O. Bondar 3:48, 3:59, 10:28; Surmiak 8:32, 14:54; Marek 10:03, 10:18, 36:46; Budniak 11:46, 23:10, 30:27; Kubik 16:58; Gąsior 22:36; Biel 26:49; Janovský 27:49; Franz 38:23, 39:59 | Report | Lalor 2:06; Glenholmes 24:18; Millar 32:51 (p) |

Svendborg Idrætscenter, Svendborg
Referee: Victor Berg-Audic (France), Chiara Perona (Italy)
23 August 2017
14:30

| København (Denmark) | 5–3 | (Greece) Doukas SAC |
|---|---|---|
| Benmoumou 24:58; Hoffmann 28:39; Christoffersen 29:50, 34:29; Johansson 31:05 | Report | Karavidas 15:58; Stavrakopoulos 22:20; Pett 23:59 |

Svendborg Idrætscenter, Svendborg
Referee: Trayan Enchev (Bulgaria), Christos Christou (Cyprus)

24 August 2017
12:00

| Doukas SAC (Greece) | 0–4 | (Poland) BTS Rekord Bielsko-Biała |
|---|---|---|
| | Report | O. Bondar 7:37; Seidler 11:44; Kałuża 37:23; Franz 39:50 |

Svendborg Idrætscenter, Svendborg
Referee: Chiara Perona (Italy), Trayan Enchev (Bulgaria)
24 August 2017
14:30

| København (Denmark) | 10–6 | (Northern Ireland) Belfast United |
|---|---|---|
| Ajanne 3:08, 26:25; Johansson 6:43, 15:35; Darraji 22:25; Scott Rasmussen 24:49; Bickersteth 25:05, 36:24; Hoffmann 29:20; Al-Faour 39:14 (p) | Report | Gunn 11:30, 22:13; Glenholmes 29:33, 30:09 (d.p); Colligan 31:49; Lalor 39:38 |

Svendborg Idrætscenter, Svendborg
Referee: Christos Christou (Cyprus), Victor Berg-Audic (France)

26 August 2017
17:00

| Belfast United (Northern Ireland) | 2–6 | (Greece) Doukas SAC |
|---|---|---|
| Magee 26:03; Glenholmes 32:02 (d.p) | Report | Pett 0:37, 15:12, 16:03, 18:25; Karavidas 19:41; Asimakopoulos 37:49 |

Svendborg Idrætscenter, Svendborg
Referee: Trayan Enchev (Bulgaria), Chiara Perona (Italy)
26 August 2017
19:30

| BTS Rekord Bielsko-Biała (Poland) | 6–3 | (Denmark) København |
|---|---|---|
| Seidler 3:23, 4:40, 23:29, 34:46; Kubik 12:02; Marek 25:12 | Report | Johansson 21:26; Hoffmann 24:03; Christoffersen 36:17 |

Svendborg Idrætscenter, Svendborg
Referee: Victor Berg-Audic (France), Christos Christou (Cyprus)

=== Group H ===
| Pos | Team | Pld | W | D | L | GF | GA | GD | Pts | Qualification |
|---|---|---|---|---|---|---|---|---|---|---|
| 1 | (Netherlands) ZVV 't Knooppunt | 3 | 3 | 0 | 0 | 16 | 8 | +8 | 9 | Main round |
| 2 | (Bulgaria) Levski Sofia Zapad | 3 | 1 | 1 | 1 | 9 | 4 | +5 | 4 | |
| 3 | (Norway) Sjarmtrollan IL (H) | 3 | 1 | 1 | 1 | 8 | 9 | −1 | 4 | |
| 4 | (Scotland) TMT Futsal Club | 3 | 0 | 0 | 3 | 4 | 16 | −12 | 0 | |

Source: UEFA
Rules for classification: Tiebreakers
(H) Hosts
23 August 2017
17:00

| Levski Sofia Zapad (Bulgaria) | 6–0 | (Scotland) TMT Futsal Club |
|---|---|---|
| Kostov 1:30, 9:44, 32:04, 32:48; Baharov 29:32; Koychev 31:15 (p) | Report |

Tromsøhallen, Tromsø
Referee: Elchin Samadli (Azerbaijan), Carl Hughes (Wales)
23 August 2017
19:30

| Sjarmtrollan IL (Norway) | 4–6 | (Netherlands) ZVV 't Knooppunt |
|---|---|---|
| Simonsen 12:25; Fossli 36:34; Allertsen 39:25; Arntzen 39:52 | Report | Attaibi 11:51; Ceyar 14:53, 33:45; Simonsen 26:59 (og); Oulad Ben Youssef 28:42; Adil Zouthane 33:29 |

Tromsøhallen, Tromsø
Referee: Vladan Radulović (Serbia), Raquel González Ruano (Spain)

24 August 2017
17:00

| ZVV 't Knooppunt (Netherlands) | 3–2 | (Bulgaria) Levski Sofia Zapad |
|---|---|---|
| Ceyar 7:04, 22:34; Adil Zouthane 19:38 | Report | Petev 7:20; Shutev 18:55 |

Tromsøhallen, Tromsø
Referee: Raquel González Ruano (Spain), Elchin Samadli (Azerbaijan)
24 August 2017
19:30

| Sjarmtrollan IL (Norway) | 3–2 | (Scotland) TMT Futsal Club |
|---|---|---|
| Vucenovic 0:36, 11:55; Johnsen 33:19 | Report | Finlay 23:07; Andrew 26:31 |

Tromsøhallen, Tromsø
Referee: Carl Hughes (Wales), Vladan Radulović (Serbia)

26 August 2017
11:00

| TMT Futsal Club (Scotland) | 2–7 | (Netherlands) ZVV 't Knooppunt |
|---|---|---|
| Mcgill 19:01; Mcdonnell 35:00 | Report | Adil Zouthane 2:31; Attaibi 10:32, 20:11; Ouaddouh 15:11; Bouzit 15:47, 15:58; van Maasbommel 30:49 |

Tromsøhallen, Tromsø
Referee: Elchin Samadli (Azerbaijan), Carl Hughes (Wales)
26 August 2017
13:30

| Levski Sofia Zapad (Bulgaria) | 1–1 | (Norway) Sjarmtrollan IL |
|---|---|---|
| Dimitrov 35:41 | Report | Schjetne 5:15 |

Tromsøhallen, Tromsø
Referee: Raquel González Ruano (Spain), Vladan Radulović (Serbia)

== Main round ==
All times are CEST (UTC+2).

=== Path A ===
The top three teams of each group advanced to the elite round.

==== Group 1 ====
| Pos | Team | Pld | W | D | L | GF | GA | GD | Pts | Qualification |
|---|---|---|---|---|---|---|---|---|---|---|
| 1 | (Belarus) Stalitsa Minsk (H) | 3 | 3 | 0 | 0 | 16 | 10 | +6 | 9 | Elite round |
| 2 | (Kazakhstan) Kairat Almaty | 3 | 2 | 0 | 1 | 15 | 8 | +7 | 6 | Elite round |
| 3 | (Italy) Pescara | 3 | 1 | 0 | 2 | 10 | 14 | −4 | 3 | Elite round |
| 4 | (Russia) Dinamo Moskva | 3 | 0 | 0 | 3 | 8 | 17 | −9 | 0 | |

Source: UEFA
Rules for classification: Tiebreakers
(H) Hosts
11 October 2017
18:15

| Kairat Almaty (Kazakhstan) | 5–1 | (Italy) Pescara |
|---|---|---|
| Douglas Junior 2:57, 9:22; Dróth 25:55; Alexandre Moraes 26:39; Higuita 32:20 | Report | Cuzzolino 19:09 (d.p) |

Sports Hall SCA, Minsk
Referee: Javier Moreno Reina (Spain), Daniel Decă (Romania)
11 October 2017
20:45

| Stalitsa Minsk (Belarus) | 5–3 | (Russia) Dinamo Moskva |
|---|---|---|
| Bruno Santiago 12:40; Chernik 35:27; Gorbenko 36:03; Mykhailo Grytsyna 38:43; Olshevski 39:53 | Report | Orlov 12:17, 34:38; Poglazov 31:21 |

Sports Hall SCA, Minsk
Referee: Costas Nicolaou (Cyprus), Toni Lehtinen (Finland)

12 October 2017
17:00

| Dinamo Moskva (Russia) | 2–7 | (Kazakhstan) Kairat Almaty |
|---|---|---|
| Karpiuk 8:19; Orlov 34:20 | Report | Taynan 9:42, 10:22, 32:08; Tayyebi 22:44, 35:55; Yesenamanov 28:12, 39:30 |

Sports Hall SCA, Minsk
Referee: Daniel Decă (Romania), Costas Nicolaou (Cyprus)
12 October 2017
19:30

| Stalitsa Minsk (Belarus) | 6–4 | (Italy) Pescara |
|---|---|---|
| Bruno Santiago 2:31, 19:56; Scherbich 17:30; Mykola Grytsyna 31:34; Korolyshyn 36:09, 37:25 | Report | Rosa 18:37, 34:45; Borruto 28:15; Morgado 39:01 |

Sports Hall SCA, Minsk
Referee: Toni Lehtinen (Finland), Javier Moreno Reina (Spain)

14 October 2017
10:00

| Pescara (Italy) | 5–3 | (Russia) Dinamo Moskva |
|---|---|---|
| Fernandão 6:51, 12:18; Rescia 16:23; Cuzzolino 21:41; Morgado 29:13 | Report | Orlov 12:00; Caputo 14:11 (og); Karpiuk 32:41 |

Sports Hall SCA, Minsk
Referee: Costas Nicolaou (Cyprus), Javier Moreno Reina (Spain)
14 October 2017
12:20

| Kairat Almaty (Kazakhstan) | 3–5 | (Belarus) Stalitsa Minsk |
|---|---|---|
| Yesenamanov 13:57, 23:21; Daniel da Rosa 22:14 | Report | Lazyuk 25:33; Bruno Santiago 25:51; Mykola Grytsyna 37:24; Chernik 38:56; Korolyshyn 39:30 |

Sports Hall SCA, Minsk
Referee: Toni Lehtinen (Finland), Daniel Decă (Romania)

==== Group 2 ====
| Pos | Team | Pld | W | D | L | GF | GA | GD | Pts | Qualification |
|---|---|---|---|---|---|---|---|---|---|---|
| 1 | (Spain) Inter FS | 3 | 3 | 0 | 0 | 12 | 2 | +10 | 9 | Elite round |
| 2 | (Russia) Dina Moskva | 3 | 2 | 0 | 1 | 7 | 7 | 0 | 6 | Elite round |
| 3 | (Portugal) Braga/AAUM | 3 | 1 | 0 | 2 | 5 | 8 | −3 | 3 | Elite round |
| 4 | (Slovenia) Brezje Maribor (H) | 3 | 0 | 0 | 3 | 5 | 12 | −7 | 0 | |

Source: UEFA
Rules for classification: Tiebreakers
(H) Hosts
11 October 2017
17:30

| Inter FS (Spain) | 4–1 | (Portugal) Braga/AAUM |
|---|---|---|
| Ricardinho 5:45; Ortiz 11:41; Solano 31:38; Gadeia 36:23 | Report | Pola 28:31 (og) |

Sport Hall Tabor, Maribor
Referee: David Schaerli (Switzerland), Andrzej Witkowski (Poland)
11 October 2017
20:00

| Brezje Maribor (Slovenia) | 2–5 | (Russia) Dina Moskva |
|---|---|---|
| Rednak 14:45; Horvath 34:03 | Report | Razorenov 18:12, 36:41; Pogorelov 23:10; Krylov 24:36; Razuvanov 37:32 |

Sport Hall Tabor, Maribor
Referee: Cédric Pelissier (France), Jan Kresta (Czech Republic)

12 October 2017
17:30

| Dina Moskva (Russia) | 0–4 | (Spain) Inter FS |
|---|---|---|
| | Report | Elisandro 14:24, 21:36; Pola 33:30; Gadeia 34:24 |

Sport Hall Tabor, Maribor
Referee: Andrzej Witkowski (Poland), David Schaerli (Switzerland)
12 October 2017
20:00

| Brezje Maribor (Slovenia) | 2–3 | (Portugal) Braga/AAUM |
|---|---|---|
| Rednak 12:05; Kroflič 34:40 | Report | Marinho 0:39; Cássio 36:41; Machado 39:36 |

Sport Hall Tabor, Maribor
Referee: Jan Kresta (Czech Republic), Andrzej Witkowski (Poland)

14 October 2017
17:30

| Braga/AAUM (Portugal) | 1–2 | (Russia) Dina Moskva |
|---|---|---|
| Marinho 9:07 | Report | Cintra 28:46 (og); Razuvanov 35:10 |

Sport Hall Tabor, Maribor
Referee: Cédric Pelissier (France), Jan Kresta (Czech Republic)
14 October 2017
20:00

| Inter FS (Spain) | 4–1 | (Slovenia) Brezje Maribor |
|---|---|---|
| Rafael 15:53; Solano 22:30; Pola 28:48; Bebe 37:18 | Report | Kroflič 21:23 |

Sport Hall Tabor, Maribor
Referee: Andrzej Witkowski (Poland), David Schaerli (Switzerland)

==== Group 3 ====
| Pos | Team | Pld | W | D | L | GF | GA | GD | Pts | Qualification |
|---|---|---|---|---|---|---|---|---|---|---|
| 1 | (Portugal) Sporting CP | 3 | 3 | 0 | 0 | 15 | 4 | +11 | 9 | Elite round |
| 2 | (Serbia) Ekonomac (H) | 3 | 2 | 0 | 1 | 8 | 6 | +2 | 6 | Elite round |
| 3 | (Ukraine) Prodexim Kherson | 3 | 1 | 0 | 2 | 7 | 11 | −4 | 3 | Elite round |
| 4 | (Latvia) Nikars Riga | 3 | 0 | 0 | 3 | 4 | 13 | −9 | 0 | |

Source: UEFA
Rules for classification: Tiebreakers
(H) Hosts
11 October 2017
18:00

| Sporting CP (Portugal) | 5–1 | (Ukraine) Prodexim Kherson |
|---|---|---|
| Pedro Cary 4:34; Fortino 12:17, 19:24; Cavinato 20:27, 21:16 | Report | Volianiuk 38:08 |

Sports Hall Jezero, Kragujevac
Attendance: 600
Referee: Tarik Kečo (Bosnia and Herzegovina), Juan Boelen (Belgium)
11 October 2017
20:30

| Ekonomac (Serbia) | 2–1 | (Latvia) Nikars Riga |
|---|---|---|
| Thales 21:07; Saiotti 39:56 | Report | Rodrigo 25:54 |

Sports Hall Jezero, Kragujevac
Attendance: 2500
Referee: Gerald Bauernfeind (Austria), Fredric Nilholt (Sweden)

12 October 2017
18:00

| Nikars Riga (Latvia) | 1–7 | (Portugal) Sporting CP |
|---|---|---|
| J. Pastars 38:10 | Report | João Matos 11:02; Pedro Cary 12:38; Cavinato 17:11, 33:59; Edgar Varela 30:48; Dieguinho 31:28; Pany Varela 36:48 |

Sports Hall Jezero, Kragujevac
Attendance: 300
Referee: Juan Boelen (Belgium), Gerald Bauernfeind (Austria)
12 October 2017
20:30

| Ekonomac (Serbia) | 4–2 | (Ukraine) Prodexim Kherson |
|---|---|---|
| Saiotti 0:41, 22:22; Rajčević 7:36; Matijević 17:27 | Report | Fumaça 6:49; Chudnov 32:21 |

Sports Hall Jezero, Kragujevac
Attendance: 2500
Referee: Fredric Nilholt (Sweden), Tarik Kečo (Bosnia and Herzegovina)

14 October 2017
18:00

| Prodexim Kherson (Ukraine) | 4–2 | (Latvia) Nikars Riga |
|---|---|---|
| Fumaça 9:22, 25:29; Volianiuk 36:42; Chudnov 37:08 | Report | Matjušenko 35:47; Avanesovs 39:53 |

Sports Hall Jezero, Kragujevac
Attendance: 400
Referee: Gerald Bauernfeind (Austria), Juan Boelen (Belgium)
14 October 2017
20:30

| Sporting CP (Portugal) | 3–2 | (Serbia) Ekonomac |
|---|---|---|
| João Matos 15:05; Cavinato 22:03; Diogo 35:29 | Report | Pršić 13:00; Saiotti 39:18 |

Sports Hall Jezero, Kragujevac
Attendance: 2700
Referee: Tarik Kečo (Bosnia and Herzegovina), Fredric Nilholt (Sweden)

==== Group 4 ====
| Pos | Team | Pld | W | D | L | GF | GA | GD | Pts | Qualification |
|---|---|---|---|---|---|---|---|---|---|---|
| 1 | (Spain) Barcelona | 3 | 2 | 1 | 0 | 12 | 3 | +9 | 7 | Elite round |
| 2 | (Italy) Luparense (H) | 3 | 1 | 2 | 0 | 10 | 5 | +5 | 5 | Elite round |
| 3 | (Hungary) Győri ETO | 3 | 1 | 0 | 2 | 6 | 16 | −10 | 3 | Elite round |
| 4 | (Czech Republic) EP Chrudim | 3 | 0 | 1 | 2 | 6 | 10 | −4 | 1 | |

Source: UEFA
Rules for classification: Tiebreakers
(H) Hosts
11 October 2017
18:00

| Barcelona (Spain) | 7–0 | (Hungary) Győri ETO |
|---|---|---|
| Adolfo 6:03; Dyego 18:37; Esquerdinha 22:40; Ferrão 25:59; Leo Santana 36:36, 38:53; Fábio Aguiar 37:42 (og) | Report |

Kioene Arena, Padua
Referee: Vitali Rakutsk (Belarus), Eduards Fatkuļins (Latvia)
11 October 2017
20:30

| Luparense (Italy) | 2–2 | (Czech Republic) EP Chrudim |
|---|---|---|
| Honorio 13:59, 21:03 | Report | Koudelka 19:54; D. Drozd 37:29 |

Kioene Arena, Padua
Referee: Admir Zahović to (Slovenia), Ruben Guerreiro (Portugal)

12 October 2017
18:00

| EP Chrudim (Czech Republic) | 0–2 | (Spain) Barcelona |
|---|---|---|
| | Report | Ferrão 30:26; Joselito 32:15 |

Kioene Arena, Padua
Referee: Eduards Fatkuļins (Latvia), Admir Zahović (Slovenia)
12 October 2017
20:30

| Luparense (Italy) | 5–0 | (Hungary) Győri ETO |
|---|---|---|
| Novaes De Souza 9:45, 35:48; Honorio 20:34; Taborda 33:08; Miarelli 37:33 | Report |

Kioene Arena, Padua
Referee: Ruben Guerreiro (Portugal), Vitali Rakutsk (Belarus)

14 October 2017
18:00

| Győri ETO (Hungary) | 6–4 | (Czech Republic) EP Chrudim |
|---|---|---|
| Juanra 3:52; Fábio Aguiar 21:12, 31:45; Álex 26:04, 36:11; González Martinez 29:38 | Report | Rešetár 10:32, 22:17; Max 12:23; Slováček 32:52 |

Kioene Arena, Padua
Referee: Admir Zahović (Slovenia), Vitali Rakutsk (Belarus)
14 October 2017
20:40

| Barcelona (Spain) | 3–3 | (Italy) Luparense |
|---|---|---|
| Esquerdinha 6:34, 18:05; Joselito 37:54 | Report | Taborda 12:44; Bueno Ardite 17:32; Novaes De Souza 18:37 |

Kioene Arena, Padua
Referee: Ruben Guerreiro (Portugal), Eduards Fatkuļins (Latvia)

=== Path B ===
The winners of each group advanced to the elite round.

According to the original main round draw, the winners of Group F would have played in Group 8, which contained Araz Naxçivan (Azerbaijan). However, since Leo Futsal (Armenia) won Group F, and teams from Armenia and Azerbaijan cannot play each other, they were moved to Group 5, swapping with the winners of Group C, Luxol St Andrews.

==== Group 5 ====
| Pos | Team | Pld | W | D | L | GF | GA | GD | Pts | Qualification |
|---|---|---|---|---|---|---|---|---|---|---|
| 1 | (Croatia) Nacional Zagreb (H) | 3 | 3 | 0 | 0 | 18 | 6 | +12 | 9 | Elite round |
| 2 | (Armenia) Leo | 3 | 1 | 1 | 1 | 11 | 13 | −2 | 4 | |
| 3 | (Kosovo) Liburni Gjakovë | 3 | 1 | 0 | 2 | 15 | 18 | −3 | 3 | |
| 4 | (France) Garges Djibson | 3 | 0 | 1 | 2 | 9 | 16 | −7 | 1 | |

Source: UEFA
Rules for classification: Tiebreakers
(H) Hosts
12 October 2017
18:00

| Garges Djibson (France) | 4–6 | (Kosovo) Liburni Gjakovë |
|---|---|---|
| Kebe 1:00; Mendy 11:00, 29:10; De Sa Andrade 25:02 | Report | Alaj 5:43; Selmanaj 6:42, 7:07, 13:05, 36:09; Mejzini 27:36 |

Sports Hall Dom Sportova, Zagreb
Referee: Nicola Manzione (Italy), Talgat Kosmukhambetov (Kazakhstan)
12 October 2017
20:30

| Nacional Zagreb (Croatia) | 4–1 | (Armenia) Leo |
|---|---|---|
| Pereverzev 8:12 (og); Pereira Junior 16:28; Matheus 19:11; Gomes 39:14 | Report | Mashumyan 21:57 |

Sports Hall Dom Sportova, Zagreb
Referee: Swen Eichler (Germany), Simon Todorovič (Slovenia)

13 October 2017
18:00

| Leo (Armenia) | 4–4 | (France) Garges Djibson |
|---|---|---|
| Mashumyan 8:08; Janjić 32:29, 37:37; Galstyan 38:42 | Report | Kebe 7:22; N'Gala 29:01; Mendy 30:01; De Sa Andrade 34:30 |

Sports Hall Dom Sportova, Zagreb
Referee: Talgat Kosmukhambetov (Kazakhstan), Swen Eichler (Germany)
13 October 2017
20:30

| Nacional Zagreb (Croatia) | 8–4 | (Kosovo) Liburni Gjakovë |
|---|---|---|
| Puertas 9:01, 18:09; Gomes 14:00, 23:17; Soares 20:21; Matan 33:58, 35:54; Matheus 36:57 | Report | Mejzini 12:31, 21:13; Dobroshi 35:32; Alibegu 38:08 |

Sports Hall Dom Sportova, Zagreb
Referee: Simon Todorovič (Slovenia), Nicola Manzione (Italy)

15 October 2017
18:00

| Liburni Gjakovë (Kosovo) | 5–6 | (Armenia) Leo |
|---|---|---|
| Alaj 4:04; Prenrecaj 14:16; Alibegu 24:41; Mejzini 25:18; Qerimi 36:53 | Report | Janjić 15:30; Nasibyan 21:41, 38:11; Vardanyan 30:09; Mashumyan 34:18, 37:56 |

Sports Hall Dom Sportova, Zagreb
Referee: Simon Todorovič (Slovenia), Talgat Kosmukhambetov (Kazakhstan)
15 October 2017
20:30

| Garges Djibson (France) | 1–6 | (Croatia) Nacional Zagreb |
|---|---|---|
| De Sa Andrade 5:35 | Report | Puertas 19:46; Postružin 22:37, 23:42; Gomes 24:55, 37:30; Pereira Junior 27:15 |

Sports Hall Dom Sportova, Zagreb
Referee: Nicola Manzione (Italy), Swen Eichler (Germany)

==== Group 6 ====
| Pos | Team | Pld | W | D | L | GF | GA | GD | Pts | Qualification |
|---|---|---|---|---|---|---|---|---|---|---|
| 1 | (Netherlands) ZVV 't Knooppunt | 3 | 2 | 0 | 1 | 10 | 7 | +3 | 6 (Note: Head-to-head result: Slov-Matic Bratislava 4–6 ZVV 't Knooppunt.) | Elite round |
| 2 | (Slovakia) Slov-Matic Bratislava (H) | 3 | 2 | 0 | 1 | 16 | 8 | +8 | 6 | |
| 3 | (Poland) BTS Rekord Bielsko-Biała | 3 | 1 | 0 | 2 | 4 | 8 | −4 | 3 (Note: Head-to-head result: BTS Rekord Bielsko-Biała 1–0 STU Telasi.) | |
| 4 | (Georgia (country)) STU Telasi | 3 | 1 | 0 | 2 | 2 | 9 | −7 | 3 | |

Source: UEFA
Rules for classification: Tiebreakers
(H) Hosts
Notes:
10 October 2017
17:30

| STU Telasi (Georgia (country)) | 2–1 | (Netherlands) ZVV 't Knooppunt |
|---|---|---|
| Nikvashvili 14:45; Kakabadze 21:17 | Report | Attaibi 22:48 |

Inter Hala Pasienky, Bratislava
Referee: Vladimir Kadykov (Russia), Antonios Adamopoulos (Greece)
10 October 2017
20:00

| Slov-Matic Bratislava (Slovakia) | 5–2 | (Poland) BTS Rekord Bielsko-Biała |
|---|---|---|
| Záruba 4:52, 7:16; Kozár 5:42; Bahna 20:44, 32:57 | Report | Popławski 6:39, 18:58 |

Inter Hala Pasienky, Bratislava
Referee: Damir Radović (Serbia), Yaroslav Vovchok (Ukraine)

11 October 2017
17:30

| BTS Rekord Bielsko-Biała (Poland) | 1–0 | (Georgia (country)) STU Telasi |
|---|---|---|
| Kubik 16:03 | Report |

Inter Hala Pasienky, Bratislava
Referee: Yaroslav Vovchok (Ukraine), Vladimir Kadykov (Russia)
11 October 2017
20:00

| Slov-Matic Bratislava (Slovakia) | 4–6 | (Netherlands) ZVV 't Knooppunt |
|---|---|---|
| Rick 14:24, 23:56; Haľko 29:25, 33:10 | Report | Bouzit 3:41; Ouaddouh 19:57, 35:22; Attaibi 22:44; Adil Zouthane 24:40; van Maasbommel 38:15 |

Inter Hala Pasienky, Bratislava
Referee: Antonios Adamopoulos (Greece), Damir Radović (Serbia)

13 October 2017
17:30

| ZVV 't Knooppunt (Netherlands) | 3–1 | (Poland) BTS Rekord Bielsko-Biała |
|---|---|---|
| Attaibi 9:18, 34:04; Ouaddouh 32:29 | Report | Seidler 18:15 |

Inter Hala Pasienky, Bratislava
Referee: Antonios Adamopoulos (Greece), Yaroslav Vovchok (Ukraine)
13 October 2017
20:00

| STU Telasi (Georgia (country)) | 0–7 | (Slovakia) Slov-Matic Bratislava |
|---|---|---|
| | Report | Zdráhal 11:56, 36:29; Péchy 15:07; Rick 17:36, 30:37; Bahna 28:30, 29:15 |

Inter Hala Pasienky, Bratislava
Referee: Vladimir Kadykov (Russia), Damir Radović (Serbia)

==== Group 7 ====
| Pos | Team | Pld | W | D | L | GF | GA | GD | Pts | Qualification |
|---|---|---|---|---|---|---|---|---|---|---|
| 1 | (Belgium) Halle-Gooik | 3 | 3 | 0 | 0 | 16 | 0 | +16 | 9 | Elite round |
| 2 | (Germany) Jahn Regensburg | 3 | 1 | 1 | 1 | 6 | 10 | −4 | 4 | |
| 3 | (Switzerland) Minerva | 3 | 1 | 0 | 2 | 6 | 15 | −9 | 3 | |
| 4 | (Finland) Sievi Futsal (H) | 3 | 0 | 1 | 2 | 5 | 8 | −3 | 1 | |

Source: UEFA
Rules for classification: Tiebreakers
(H) Hosts
11 October 2017
15:30

| Halle-Gooik (Belgium) | 8–0 | (Switzerland) Minerva |
|---|---|---|
| Leo 7:29, 27:28, 38:00; Bissoni 24:51; Leitão 28:22, 30:03, 32:06; Rahou 35:50 | Report |

Raahe Sports Hall, Raahe
Referee: Borislav Kolev (Bulgaria), Peter Nurse (England)
11 October 2017
18:00

| Sievi Futsal (Finland) | 2–2 | (Germany) Jahn Regensburg |
|---|---|---|
| Väinälä 18:11; Jaakko Alasuutari 38:17 | Report | Hasso 23:16; Marquinhos 29:13 |

Raahe Sports Hall, Raahe
Referee: Ozan Soykan (Turkey), Grigori Zelentsov (Russia)

12 October 2017
15:30

| Jahn Regensburg (Germany) | 0–6 | (Belgium) Halle-Gooik |
|---|---|---|
| | Report | Leitão 2:25; Rahou 26:57, 39:51; Carpes 30:21; Teixeira 35:42; Leo 38:29 |

Raahe Sports Hall, Raahe
Referee: Peter Nurse (England), Ozan Soykan (Turkey)
12 October 2017
18:00

| Sievi Futsal (Finland) | 3–4 | (Switzerland) Minerva |
|---|---|---|
| Väinälä 12:11, 38:12; Buckson 15:08 (og) | Report | Machado 4:31; Buckson 18:43; Marcoyannakis 22:59; Santona 34:36 |

Raahe Sports Hall, Raahe
Referee: Grigori Zelentsov (Russia), Borislav Kolev (Bulgaria)

14 October 2017
12:30

| Minerva (Switzerland) | 2–4 | (Germany) Jahn Regensburg |
|---|---|---|
| Maksutaj 19:48 (d.p); Machado 23:50 | Report | Marquinhos 18:31, 21:06; Andre Caro 28:11; Douglas Neutzling 36:28 |

Raahe Sports Hall, Raahe
Referee: Grigori Zelentsov (Russia), Peter Nurse (England)
14 October 2017
15:00

| Halle-Gooik (Belgium) | 2–0 | (Finland) Sievi Futsal |
|---|---|---|
| Cordier 12:06; Leitão 38:28 | Report |

Raahe Sports Hall, Raahe
Referee: Borislav Kolev (Bulgaria), Ozan Soykan (Turkey)

==== Group 8 ====
| Pos | Team | Pld | W | D | L | GF | GA | GD | Pts | Qualification |
|---|---|---|---|---|---|---|---|---|---|---|
| 1 | (Romania) Autobergamo Deva (H) | 3 | 2 | 0 | 1 | 13 | 8 | +5 | 6 (Note: Head-to-head result: Araz Naxçivan 3–6 Autobergamo Deva.) | Elite round |
| 2 | (Azerbaijan) Araz Naxçivan | 3 | 2 | 0 | 1 | 14 | 12 | +2 | 6 | |
| 3 | (Malta) Luxol St Andrews | 3 | 1 | 0 | 2 | 11 | 13 | −2 | 3 (Note: Head-to-head result: Mostar SG Staklorad 2–5 Luxol St Andrews.) | |
| 4 | (Bosnia and Herzegovina) Mostar SG Staklorad | 3 | 1 | 0 | 2 | 7 | 12 | −5 | 3 | |

Source: UEFA
Rules for classification: Tiebreakers
(H) Hosts
Notes:
11 October 2017
15:30

| Araz Naxçivan (Azerbaijan) | 5–2 | (Bosnia and Herzegovina) Mostar SG Staklorad |
|---|---|---|
| Bolinha 0:25; Baghirov 15:24; Maikinho 19:52, 25:15; Atayev 20:14 | Report | Vesić 14:28; Aladžić 34:16 |

Sports Hall, Deva
Referee: Tomasz Frąk (Poland), Kirill Naishouler (Finland)
11 October 2017
18:00

| Autobergamo Deva (Romania) | 5–2 | (Malta) Luxol St Andrews |
|---|---|---|
| Stoica 7:43; F. Matei 9:23; M. Matei 10:37; A. Csoma 21:03; Toniţa 25:06 | Report | Rogerinho 23:47, 34:06 |

Sports Hall, Deva
Referee: Ibrahim El Jilali (Netherlands), Shota Kukhilava (Georgia)

12 October 2017
15:30

| Luxol St Andrews (Malta) | 4–6 | (Azerbaijan) Araz Naxçivan |
|---|---|---|
| Penava 9:37, 31:54; Autio 10:42; Rogerinho 25:03 | Report | Maikinho 19:54, 22:59, 28:47, 38:15; Vilela 34:04; Bolinha 38:51 |

Sports Hall, Deva
Referee: Kirill Naishouler (Finland), Ibrahim El Jilali (Netherlands)
12 October 2017
18:00

| Autobergamo Deva (Romania) | 2–3 | (Bosnia and Herzegovina) Mostar SG Staklorad |
|---|---|---|
| M. Matei 23:20; A. Csoma 38:05 | Report | Hrkać 6:23, 23:42; Bošković 15:40 |

Sports Hall, Deva
Referee: Shota Kukhilava (Georgia), Tomasz Frąk (Poland)

14 October 2017
15:30

| Mostar SG Staklorad (Bosnia and Herzegovina) | 2–5 | (Malta) Luxol St Andrews |
|---|---|---|
| Aladžić 12:58; Hrkać 25:30 | Report | Răducu 18:18; Vuković 29:39; Autio 33:59; Penava 34:28; Despotović 37:14 (d.p) |

Sports Hall, Deva
Referee: Shota Kukhilava (Georgia), Kirill Naishouler (Finland)
14 October 2017
18:00

| Araz Naxçivan (Azerbaijan) | 3–6 | (Romania) Autobergamo Deva |
|---|---|---|
| Vilela 7:01; Bolinha 30:33; Chovdarov 38:57 | Report | F. Matei 5:22, 18:12, 38:16; Ignat 17:06; Panzaru 23:15; Toniţa 37:22 |

Sports Hall, Deva
Referee: Tomasz Frąk (Poland), Ibrahim El Jilali (Netherlands)

== Elite round ==
The draw for the elite round was held on 19 October 2017, 13:30 CEST, at the UEFA headquarters in Nyon, Switzerland. The 16 teams were drawn into four groups of four, containing one Path A group winners (seeding position 1), one Path A group runners-up (seeding position 2), and two teams which were either Path A group third-placed teams or Path B group winners (seeding positions 3 or 4). First, the four teams which were pre-selected as hosts (marked by (H) below) were drawn from their own designated pot and allocated to their respective group as per their seeding positions. Next, the remaining 12 teams were drawn from their respective pot which were allocated according to their seeding positions. For teams (including hosts) which were neither Path A group winners nor runners-up, they were first allocated to fill position 4 of all groups before position 3. Winners and runners-up from the same Path A group could not be drawn in the same group, but third-placed teams could be drawn in the same group as winners or runners-up from the same Path A group. Teams from the same association could be drawn against each other. Based on the decisions taken by the UEFA Emergency Panel, teams from Russia and Ukraine would not be drawn into the same group.

Main round Path A
| Group | Winners (seeding position 1) | Runners-up (seeding position 2) | Third-placed teams (seeding position 3 or 4) |
|---|---|---|---|
| 1 | (Belarus) Stalitsa Minsk | (Kazakhstan) Kairat Almaty | (Italy) Pescara (H) |
| 2 | (Spain) Inter FS (H) | (Russia) Dina Moskva | (Portugal) Braga/AAUM |
| 3 | (Portugal) Sporting CP (H) | (Serbia) Ekonomac | (Ukraine) Prodexim Kherson |
| 4 | (Spain) Barcelona | (Italy) Luparense | (Hungary) Győri ETO (H) |
Main round Path B
| Group | Winners (seeding position 3 or 4) | | |
| 5 | (Croatia) Nacional Zagreb | | |
| 6 | (Netherlands) ZVV 't Knooppunt | | |
| 7 | (Belgium) Halle-Gooik | | |
| 8 | (Romania) Autobergamo Deva | | |

The winners of each group advance to the final tournament.

All times are CET (UTC+1).

=== Group A ===
| Pos | Team | Pld | W | D | L | GF | GA | GD | Pts | Qualification |
|---|---|---|---|---|---|---|---|---|---|---|
| 1 | (Spain) Barcelona | 3 | 3 | 0 | 0 | 12 | 3 | +9 | 9 | Final tournament |
| 2 | (Serbia) Ekonomac | 3 | 2 | 0 | 1 | 14 | 9 | +5 | 6 | |
| 3 | (Italy) Pescara (H) | 3 | 1 | 0 | 2 | 13 | 9 | +4 | 3 | |
| 4 | (Netherlands) ZVV 't Knooppunt | 3 | 0 | 0 | 3 | 4 | 22 | −18 | 0 | |

Source: UEFA
Rules for classification: Tiebreakers
(H) Hosts
22 November 2017
17:30

| Barcelona (Spain) | 6–0 | (Netherlands) ZVV 't Knooppunt |
|---|---|---|
| Leo Santana 10:16; Ferrão 18:03; Tolrà 18:26; Aicardo 29:01, 35:05; Joselito 39:50 | Report |

Palasport Giovanni Paolo II, Pescara
Referee: Eduardo Fernandes Coelho (Portugal), Oleg Ivanov (Ukraine)
22 November 2017
20:00

| Pescara (Italy) | 3–5 | (Serbia) Ekonomac |
|---|---|---|
| Borruto 7:29, 16:29; Saad 20:14 | Report | Rnić 17:52; Saiotti 30:13; Borisov 33:13; Rajčević 35:11; Igor 37:33 |

Palasport Giovanni Paolo II, Pescara
Referee: Marc Birkett (England), Admir Zahović (Slovenia)

23 November 2017
17:30

| Ekonomac (Serbia) | 2–3 | (Spain) Barcelona |
|---|---|---|
| Saiotti 0:25; Thales 31:31 | Report | Ferrão 9:16; Adolfo 26:34; Joselito 34:58 |

Palasport Giovanni Paolo II, Pescara
Referee: Admir Zahović (Slovenia), Eduardo Fernandes Coelho (Portugal)
23 November 2017
20:00

| Pescara (Italy) | 9–1 | (Netherlands) ZVV 't Knooppunt |
|---|---|---|
| Rescia 0:37; Cuzzolino 2:04, 24:23; Rosa 12:49, 29:40; Romano 26:19, 39:38; Borruto 31:34, 33:29 | Report | Ceyar 10:46 |

Palasport Giovanni Paolo II, Pescara
Referee: Oleg Ivanov (Ukraine), Marc Birkett (England)

25 November 2017
17:30

| ZVV 't Knooppunt (Netherlands) | 3–7 | (Serbia) Ekonomac |
|---|---|---|
| El Ghannouti 31:53, 39:50; Bouzit 35:03 | Report | Igor 1:53; Kopanja 3:08; Lazarević 7:30; Rnić 13:50; S. Ivanković 30:09; Thales 37:42, 38:31 |

Palasport Giovanni Paolo II, Pescara
Referee: Oleg Ivanov (Ukraine), Admir Zahović (Slovenia)
25 November 2017
20:35

| Barcelona (Spain) | 3–1 | (Italy) Pescara |
|---|---|---|
| Dyego 21:34, 38:50; Rafa López 22:16 | Report | Rescia 39:13 |

Palasport Giovanni Paolo II, Pescara
Referee: Marc Birkett (England), Eduardo Fernandes Coelho (Portugal)

=== Group B ===
| Pos | Team | Pld | W | D | L | GF | GA | GD | Pts | Qualification |
|---|---|---|---|---|---|---|---|---|---|---|
| 1 | (Portugal) Sporting CP (H) | 3 | 3 | 0 | 0 | 10 | 3 | +7 | 9 | Final tournament |
| 2 | (Belgium) Halle-Gooik | 3 | 2 | 0 | 1 | 7 | 5 | +2 | 6 | |
| 3 | (Croatia) Nacional Zagreb | 3 | 1 | 0 | 2 | 5 | 8 | −3 | 3 | |
| 4 | (Russia) Dina Moskva | 3 | 0 | 0 | 3 | 3 | 9 | −6 | 0 | |

Source: UEFA
Rules for classification: Tiebreakers
(H) Hosts
22 November 2017
14:30

| Dina Moskva (Russia) | 2–3 | (Croatia) Nacional Zagreb |
|---|---|---|
| Razuvanov 13:27; Razorenov 32:31 | Report | Matheus 16:04, 37:44; Gomes 31:09 |

Pavilhão João Rocha, Lisbon
Referee: Cédric Pelissier (France), Tomasz Frąk (Poland)
22 November 2017
17:00

| Sporting CP (Portugal) | 3–2 | (Belgium) Halle-Gooik |
|---|---|---|
| Marcão 13:08; Divanei 24:55; Caio Japa 31:01 | Report | Bissoni 36:17; Leitão 39:51 |

Pavilhão João Rocha, Lisbon
Referee: Gábor Kovács (Hungary), Timo Onatsu (Finland)

23 November 2017
19:00

| Halle-Gooik (Belgium) | 2–1 | (Russia) Dina Moskva |
|---|---|---|
| Galan Carsi 23:32; Leitão 27:48 | Report | Starodubov 5:07 |

Pavilhão João Rocha, Lisbon
Referee: Tomasz Frąk (Poland), Gábor Kovács (Hungary)
23 November 2017
21:30

| Sporting CP (Portugal) | 3–1 | (Croatia) Nacional Zagreb |
|---|---|---|
| Fortino 14:53; Pany Varela 26:45; Pedro Cary 39:22 | Report | Matheus 37:58 |

Pavilhão João Rocha, Lisbon
Referee: Timo Onatsu (Finland), Cédric Pelissier (France)

25 November 2017
15:30

| Nacional Zagreb (Croatia) | 1–3 | (Belgium) Halle-Gooik |
|---|---|---|
| Puertas 38:05 | Report | Teixeira 10:01, 18:55; Gréllo 27:55 (p) |

Pavilhão João Rocha, Lisbon
Referee: Gábor Kovács (Hungary), Timo Onatsu (Finland)
25 November 2017
18:00

| Dina Moskva (Russia) | 0–4 | (Portugal) Sporting CP |
|---|---|---|
| | Report | Cavinato 7:07; Divanei 15:26; Alex Merlim 27:01; Dieguinho 30:28 |

Pavilhão João Rocha, Lisbon
Referee: Cédric Pelissier (France), Tomasz Frąk (Poland)

=== Group C ===
| Pos | Team | Pld | W | D | L | GF | GA | GD | Pts | Qualification |
|---|---|---|---|---|---|---|---|---|---|---|
| 1 | (Hungary) Győri ETO (H) | 3 | 2 | 0 | 1 | 11 | 9 | +2 | 6 (Note: Head-to-head result: Luparense 4–6 Győri ETO.) | Final tournament |
| 2 | (Italy) Luparense | 3 | 2 | 0 | 1 | 15 | 11 | +4 | 6 | |
| 3 | (Ukraine) Prodexim Kherson | 3 | 1 | 0 | 2 | 10 | 9 | +1 | 3 (Note: Head-to-head result: Prodexim Kherson 7–3 Stalitsa Minsk.) | |
| 4 | (Belarus) Stalitsa Minsk | 3 | 1 | 0 | 2 | 10 | 17 | −7 | 3 | |

Source: UEFA
Rules for classification: Tiebreakers
(H) Hosts
Notes:
22 November 2017
15:30

| Luparense (Italy) | 3–1 | (Ukraine) Prodexim Kherson |
|---|---|---|
| Taborda 10:36, 39:18; Bueno Ardite 23:08 | Report | Sviridov 26:42 |

Magvassy Mihály Sportcsarnok, Győr
Referee: Juan Gallardo (Spain), Gerald Bauernfeind (Austria)
22 November 2017
18:00

| Győri ETO (Hungary) | 2–3 | (Belarus) Stalitsa Minsk |
|---|---|---|
| Álex 22:52; Fábio Aguiar 36:56 | Report | Pessoa Dos Santos 25:42; Mykhailo Grytsyna 27:48; Lazyuk 37:28 |

Magvassy Mihály Sportcsarnok, Győr
Referee: Bogdan Sorescu (Romania), Borislav Kolev (Bulgaria)

23 November 2017
17:00

| Stalitsa Minsk (Belarus) | 4–8 | (Italy) Luparense |
|---|---|---|
| Zhdanovich 13:02; Lazyuk 17:23, 30:51; Korolyshyn 33:02 | Report | Mello Rossi 11:03 (d.p), 36:15; Taborda 14:08; Novaes De Souza 22:46; Bueno Ardite 27:00, 32:22; Revert 35:48 (d.p), 38:22 (d.p) |

Magvassy Mihály Sportcsarnok, Győr
Referee: Borislav Kolev (Bulgaria), Juan Gallardo (Spain)
23 November 2017
19:30

| Győri ETO (Hungary) | 3–2 | (Ukraine) Prodexim Kherson |
|---|---|---|
| Juanra 34:27; Fábio Aguiar 38:09, 39:55 | Report | Fumaça 11:45; Chudnov 24:00 |

Magvassy Mihály Sportcsarnok, Győr
Referee: Gerald Bauernfeind (Austria), Bogdan Sorescu (Romania)

25 November 2017
15:30

| Prodexim Kherson (Ukraine) | 7–3 | (Belarus) Stalitsa Minsk |
|---|---|---|
| Bessalov 2:26; Sviridov 24:27, 38:44 (d.p); Roninho 28:12; Fetko 36:59; Tsypun 38:28; Kalukov 39:22 | Report | Mykhailo Grytsyna 0:31; Zhdanovich 7:41; Chernik 19:48 |

Magvassy Mihály Sportcsarnok, Győr
Referee: Borislav Kolev (Bulgaria), Gerald Bauernfeind (Austria)
25 November 2017
18:00

| Luparense (Italy) | 4–6 | (Hungary) Győri ETO |
|---|---|---|
| Juanra 4:11 (og); Jefferson 7:25; Taborda 18:22; Betão 38:37 | Report | Álex 7:05, 10:01; Fábio Aguiar 21:46, 37:18, 39:16; Juanra 36:09 |

Magvassy Mihály Sportcsarnok, Győr
Referee: Bogdan Sorescu (Romania), Juan Gallardo (Spain)

=== Group D ===
| Pos | Team | Pld | W | D | L | GF | GA | GD | Pts | Qualification |
|---|---|---|---|---|---|---|---|---|---|---|
| 1 | (Spain) Inter FS (H) | 3 | 3 | 0 | 0 | 14 | 4 | +10 | 9 | Final tournament |
| 2 | (Kazakhstan) Kairat Almaty | 3 | 2 | 0 | 1 | 12 | 8 | +4 | 6 | |
| 3 | (Portugal) Braga/AAUM | 3 | 1 | 0 | 2 | 9 | 16 | −7 | 3 | |
| 4 | (Romania) Autobergamo Deva | 3 | 0 | 0 | 3 | 8 | 15 | −7 | 0 | |

Source: UEFA
Rules for classification: Tiebreakers
(H) Hosts
23 November 2017
18:30

| Kairat Almaty (Kazakhstan) | 5–2 | (Romania) Autobergamo Deva |
|---|---|---|
| Leo 6:49, 31:55; Higuita 15:14; Tayyebi 21:37, 34:07 | Report | M. Matei 1:16, 33:35 |

Pabellón Jorge Garbajosa, Torrejón de Ardoz
Referee: Saša Tomić (Croatia), Pascal Lemal (Belgium)
23 November 2017
21:00

| Inter FS (Spain) | 7–0 | (Portugal) Braga/AAUM |
|---|---|---|
| Elisandro 7:55; Bruno Taffy 10:57; Ricardinho 12:50; Gadeia 16:51, 19:32; Nílson Miguel 30:10 (og); Daniel 34:16 | Report |

Pabellón Jorge Garbajosa, Torrejón de Ardoz
Referee: Angelo Galante (Italy), Ondřej Černý (Czech Republic)

24 November 2017
18:30

| Braga/AAUM (Portugal) | 1–4 | (Kazakhstan) Kairat Almaty |
|---|---|---|
| Ruan 28:14 | Report | Taynan 10:50, 19:04; Marinho 12:38 (og); Higuita 36:15 |

Pabellón Jorge Garbajosa, Torrejón de Ardoz
Referee: Ondřej Černý (Czech Republic), Saša Tomić (Croatia)
24 November 2017
21:30

| Inter FS (Spain) | 2–1 | (Romania) Autobergamo Deva |
|---|---|---|
| Ricardinho 1:02; Ortiz 8:55 | Report | Paulo Ferreira 27:14 |

Pabellón Jorge Garbajosa, Torrejón de Ardoz
Referee: Pascal Lemal (Belgium), Angelo Galante (Italy)

26 November 2017
17:30

| Autobergamo Deva (Romania) | 5–8 | (Portugal) Braga/AAUM |
|---|---|---|
| Panzaru 8:37; Paulo Ferreira 19:54, 39:47 (d.p); M. Matei 30:13; Obadă 30:36 | Report | Machado 11:22, 23:13, 31:19; Cintra 24:29, 36:52; Ruan 25:09; Lopes 26:59; Marinho 34:23 |

Pabellón Jorge Garbajosa, Torrejón de Ardoz
Referee: Pascal Lemal (Belgium), Ondřej Černý (Czech Republic)
26 November 2017
20:00

| Kairat Almaty (Kazakhstan) | 3–5 | (Spain) Inter FS |
|---|---|---|
| Alexandre Moraes 3:28; Leo 7:07, 20:28 | Report | Ortiz 1:35; Elisandro 5:06; Ricardinho 15:45; Gadeia 33:51, 38:42 (d.p) |

Pabellón Jorge Garbajosa, Torrejón de Ardoz
Referee: Saša Tomić (Croatia), Angelo Galante (Italy)

== Final tournament ==
The hosts of the final tournament were selected by UEFA from the four qualified teams, and with two Spanish teams in the final tournament, UEFA announced on 7 December 2017 that it would be hosted at the Pabellón Príncipe Felipe in Zaragoza, Spain.

The draw for the final tournament was held on 14 March 2018, 21:30 CET (UTC+1), at the Camp Nou in Barcelona during half-time of the UEFA Champions League round of 16 second leg between Barcelona and Chelsea. The four teams were drawn into two semi-finals without any restrictions.

In the final tournament, extra time and penalty shoot-out are used to decide the winner if necessary; however, no extra time is used in the third place match (Regulations Article 17.01 and 17.02).

=== Bracket ===
Semi-finals
20 April – Zaragoza
(Hungary) Győri ETO | 1
(Portugal) Sporting CP | 6
20 April – Zaragoza
(Spain) Inter FS | 2
(Spain) Barcelona | 1

Final
22 April – Zaragoza
(Portugal) Sporting CP | 2
(Spain) Inter FS | 5
Third place match
22 April – Zaragoza
(Hungary) Győri ETO | 1
(Spain) Barcelona | 7

All times are CEST (UTC+2).

=== Semi-finals ===
20 April 2018
18:00

| Győri ETO (Hungary) | 1–6 | (Portugal) Sporting CP |
|---|---|---|
| Sáhó 34:04 | Report | Alex Merlim 0:58; Cardinal 2:16, 10:55; Cavinato 12:55; Diogo 19:56; Dieguinho 37:11 |

Pabellón Príncipe Felipe, Zaragoza
Attendance: 4167
Referee: Ondřej Černý (Czech Republic), Angelo Galante (Italy)

20 April 2018
21:00

| Inter FS (Spain) | 2–1 | (Spain) Barcelona |
|---|---|---|
| Ortiz 3:18, 31:28 | Report | Esquerdinha 28:30 |

Pabellón Príncipe Felipe, Zaragoza
Attendance: 8967
Referee: Bogdan Sorescu (Romania), Saša Tomić (Croatia)

=== Third place match ===
22 April 2018
17:00

| Győri ETO (Hungary) | 1–7 | (Spain) Barcelona |
|---|---|---|
| Álex 18:23 | Report | Esquerdinha 11:47, 19:33, 28:31; Mario Rivillos 28:58; Ferrão 29:24, 31:29; Lozano 34:05 |

Pabellón Príncipe Felipe, Zaragoza
Attendance: 5028
Referee: Ondřej Černý (Czech Republic), Angelo Galante (Italy)

=== Final ===
22 April 2018
20:00

| Sporting CP (Portugal) | 2–5 | (Spain) Inter FS |
|---|---|---|
| Cavinato 7:10; Diogo 36:44 | Report | Gadeia 2:57; Ricardinho 9:51; Elisandro 13:08; Rafael 22:53; Pola 39:57 |

Pabellón Príncipe Felipe, Zaragoza
Attendance: 8179
Referee: Bogdan Sorescu (Romania), Saša Tomić (Croatia)

== Top goalscorers ==
Notes

- — denotes the team did not participate in this stage.

| Rank | Player | Team | PR | MR | ER | FT | Total |
|---|---|---|---|---|---|---|---|
| 1 | (Albania) Halim Selmanaj | (Kosovo) Liburni Gjakovë | 8 | 4 | — | — | 12 |
| 2 | (Czech Republic) Michal Seidler | (Poland) BTS Rekord Bielsko-Biała | 8 | 1 | — | — | 9 |
| 3 | (Bosnia and Herzegovina) Marijo Aladžić | (Bosnia and Herzegovina) Mostar SG Staklorad | 6 | 2 | — | — | 8 |
| 3 | (Portugal) Fábio Aguiar | (Hungary) Győri ETO | — | 2 | 6 | 0 | 8 |
| 3 | (Italy) Diego Cavinato | (Portugal) Sporting CP | — | 5 | 1 | 2 | 8 |
| 6 | (Italy) Alemão | (Germany) Jahn Regensburg | 7 | 0 | — | — | 7 |
| 6 | (Netherlands) Mohamed Attaibi | (Netherlands) ZVV 't Knooppunt | 3 | 4 | 0 | — | 7 |
| 6 | (Russia) Leandro Esquerdinha | (Spain) Barcelona | — | 3 | 0 | 4 | 7 |
| 6 | (Brazil) Gadeia | (Spain) Inter FS | — | 2 | 4 | 1 | 7 |
| 6 | (Portugal) Fernando Leitão | (Belgium) Halle-Gooik | — | 5 | 2 | — | 7 |

Source: UEFA
