= 2025–26 Swiss Futsal Premier League =

Swiss Futsal Premier League
- Season: 2025–26
- Dates: 19 September 2025 – 30 May 2026
- Champions: Minerva
- Relegated: Futsal Maniacs; Wil 1900
- Matches: 127
- Goals: 1,366 (10.76 per match)
- Biggest home win: Minerva 21–1 Wil 1900 (25 October 2025)
- Biggest away win: Benfica 1–14 Uni Bulle (14 February 2026)
- Highest scoring: Minerva 21–1 Wil 1900 (25 October 2025)
- Longest winning run: 25 matches Minerva
- Longest unbeaten run: 25 matches Minerva

The 2025–26 Swiss Futsal Premier League was a season of the Swiss Futsal Premier League, the top-level men's futsal competition in Switzerland. Futsal Minerva won the title, beating Uni Futsal Team Bulle 2–0 in the final series.

== Team changes ==
=== Relegated from 2024–25 Swiss Futsal Premier League ===
- Friends United

=== Promoted from 2024–25 Swiss Futsal Second League ===
- Empire Futsal Club Ebikon
- Bulle Futsal's

== Regular season ==
=== League table ===
Pos	Team	Pld	W	D	L	GF	GA	GD	Pts	Status
1	Minerva	11	11	0	0	100	24	+76	33	Qualification to championship round
2	Uni Bulle	11	9	1	1	70	43	+27	28	Qualification to championship round
3	Mobulu	11	8	1	2	51	39	+12	25	Qualification to championship round
4	Charmilles	11	8	1	2	93	54	+39	25	Qualification to championship round
5	Bulle	11	6	1	4	67	39	+28	19	Qualification to championship round
6	Benfica	11	5	2	4	51	56	−5	17	Qualification to championship round
7	Le Parc	11	4	1	6	43	62	−19	13	Qualification to relegation round
8	Empire Ebikon	11	3	1	7	50	70	−20	10	Qualification to relegation round
9	Wil 1900	11	2	0	9	48	92	−44	6	Qualification to relegation round
10	Racing Lausanne	11	2	0	9	29	64	−35	6	Qualification to relegation round
11	Salines	11	2	0	9	43	70	−27	6	Qualification to relegation round
12	Maniacs	11	2	0	9	42	74	−32	6	Qualification to relegation round

Source: SFA

=== Results ===
Home \ Away	BEN	BUL	CHA	EMP	LEP	MAN	MIN	MOB	RCL	SAL	UBU	WIL
Benfica		0–3	5–12	—	—	—	—	3–3	4–2	—	—	9–4
Bulle	—		3–8	—	—	12–1	—	—	—	9–4	—	10–3
Charmilles	—	—		7–5	13–7	11–7	4–6	—	—	11–1	8–8	—
Empire Ebikon	6–6	4–11	—		—	9–4	—	—	5–1	3–9	—	—
Le Parc	2–4	3–3	—	3–6		—	2–7	—	2–1	—	—	9–8
Maniacs	2–9	—	—	—	4–5		1–9	—	4–1	—	—	—
Minerva	11–1	6–2	—	8–3	—	—		9–3	12–3	—	—	21–1
Mobulu	—	—	3–0	6–2	7–1	4–3	—		—	4–2	6–11	—
Racing Lausanne	—	1–9	3–10	—	—	—	—	3–4		7–5	—	5–2
Salines	5–7	—	—	—	4–5	7–5	2–7	—	—		2–8	—
Uni Bulle	6–3	4–3	—	7–2	5–4	—	2–4	—	7–2	—		—
Wil 1900	—	—	6–9	8–5	—	3–8	—	3–6	—	4–2	6–8	

Updated to match(es) played on 14 December 2025. Source: SFA
Legend: Blue = home team win; Yellow = draw; Red = away team win.

== Championship round ==
Pos	Team	Pld	W	D	L	GF	GA	GD	Pts	Status
1	Minerva	21	21	0	0	168	45	+123	63	Qualification to the championship play-offs
2	Charmilles	21	15	2	4	158	96	+62	47	Qualification to the championship play-offs
3	Uni Bulle	21	14	2	5	140	90	+50	44	Qualification to the championship play-offs
4	Bulle	21	10	2	9	101	78	+23	32	Qualification to the championship play-offs
5	Mobulu	21	8	2	11	82	109	−27	26	
6	Benfica	21	6	4	11	81	135	−54	22	

Source: SFA

=== Results ===
Home \ Away	BEN	BUL	CHA	MIN	MOB	UBU
Benfica		6–6	2–6	0–10	8–6	1–14
Bulle	6–3		3–4	1–4	4–1	2–5
Charmilles	9–2	7–1		3–4	8–2	8–5
Minerva	6–1	5–3	12–3		5–0	8–4
Mobulu	6–6	2–5	4–10	0–7		7–10
Uni Bulle	10–1	2–3	7–7	6–7	7–3	

Updated to match(es) played on 26 April 2026. Source: SFA
Legend: Blue = home team win; Yellow = draw; Red = away team win.

== Relegation round ==
Pos	Team	Pld	W	D	L	GF	GA	GD	Pts	Status
1	Empire Ebikon	21	9	3	9	115	112	+3	30	
2	Salines	21	9	0	12	104	124	−20	27	
3	Le Parc	21	8	3	10	88	117	−29	27	
4	Racing Lausanne	21	8	1	12	86	98	−12	25	
5	Wil 1900	21	5	0	16	113	164	−51	15	Relegation to regional league
6	Maniacs	21	3	1	17	71	139	−68	10	Relegation to regional league

Source: SFA

=== Results ===
Home \ Away	EMP	LEP	MAN	RCL	SAL	WIL
Empire Ebikon		7–7	4–4	3–0	6–8	9–5
Le Parc	1–5		3–0	4–13	7–3	5–4
Maniacs	0–8	5–4		3–6	3–6	4–7
Racing Lausanne	7–4	3–3	9–1		9–2	4–3
Salines	4–7	10–4	6–3	3–0		9–6
Wil 1900	6–12	5–7	12–6	8–6	9–10	

Updated to match(es) played on 26 April 2026. Source: SFA
Legend: Blue = home team win; Yellow = draw; Red = away team win.

== Playoffs ==
The four top teams of the championship round qualified for the playoffs. Both the semi-finals and the final were played as best-of-three series.

=== Semi-finals ===
==== Minerva v Bulle ====
Minerva won the series 2–0.

3 May 2026
18:30

Bulle	0–7	Minerva
	Report

9 May 2026
18:30

Minerva	6–4 (a.e.t.)	Bulle
	Report

==== Charmilles v Uni Bulle ====
Uni Bulle won the series 2–0.

3 May 2026
14:00

Uni Bulle	10–9	Charmilles
	Report

10 May 2026
14:30

Charmilles	6–9	Uni Bulle
	Report

=== Final ===
Minerva won the series 2–0.

24 May 2026
15:00

Uni Bulle	3–12	Minerva
	Report

30 May 2026
15:00

Minerva	5–3 (a.e.t.)	Uni Bulle
	Report
