= Swiss Futsal Cup =

- Current champions: Futsal Minerva
- Most championships: Futsal Minerva (4 times)
- 2026–27 Swiss Futsal Cup

The Swiss Futsal Cup is the national cup competition for men's futsal clubs in Switzerland. It was first founded in 2022 alongside the women's cup. Futsal Minerva won the first edition.

The competition is held annually among teams competing in the Swiss Futsal Premier League and the Swiss Futsal Second League.

== Finals ==
Season	Champion	Score	Runner-up
2023–23	Futsal Minerva	4–1	Futsal Maniacs
2023–24	Futsal Minerva	4–1	Salines Futsal
2024–25	Futsal Minerva	9–4	FC Le Parc
2025–26	Futsal Minerva	7–1	Futsal Club Benfica
2026–27			
