= 2026–27 Swiss Futsal Premier League =

Swiss Futsal Premier League
- Season: 2026–27
- Dates: 13 September 2026 –
- Matches: 31
- Goals: 385 (12.42 per match)
- Biggest home win: Benfica 29–0 Peseux Comète (27 September 2026)
- Biggest away win: Peseux Comète 2–21 Le Parc (4 October 2026)
- Highest scoring: Benfica 29–0 Peseux Comète (27 September 2026)
- Longest winning run: 3 matches Bulle; Minerva; Salines
- Longest unbeaten run: 7 matches Bulle
- Longest winless run: 6 matches Esperanza; Peseux Comète
- Longest losing run: 6 matches Peseux Comète
- All statistics correct as of 1 November 2026.

The 2026–27 Swiss Futsal Premier League is the current edition of the Swiss Futsal Premier League, the top-level men's futsal competition in Switzerland. Futsal Minerva are the defending champions.

== Team changes ==
=== Relegated from 2025–26 Swiss Futsal Premier League ===
- Futsal Maniacs
- FC Wil 1900 Futsal

== Regular season ==
=== League table ===
Pos	Team	Pld	W	D	L	GF	GA	GD	Pts	Status
1	Bulle	7	6	1	0	50	16	+34	19	Qualification to championship round
2	Minerva	6	5	1	0	51	14	+37	16	Qualification to championship round
3	Salines	7	5	0	2	48	39	+9	15	Qualification to championship round
4	Benfica	6	4	0	2	55	23	+32	12	Qualification to championship round
5	Empire Ebikon	6	2	2	2	34	21	+13	8	Qualification to championship round
6	Le Parc	6	2	1	3	45	36	+9	7	Qualification to championship round
7	Mobulu	6	2	0	4	31	42	−11	6	Qualification to relegation round
8	Charmilles (Note: Three points deducted.)	6	2	0	4	41	45	−4	3	Qualification to relegation round
9	Peseux Comète	6	0	0	6	8	106	−98	0	Qualification to relegation round
10	Esperanza (Note: Nine points deducted for fair play.)	6	0	1	5	22	43	−21	−8	Qualification to relegation round

Updated to match(es) played on 1 November 2026. Source: SFA

=== Results ===
Home \ Away	BEN	BUL	CHA	EMP	ESP	LEP	MIN	MOB	PES	SAL
Benfica		—	6–4	—			4–5	—	29–0	—
Bulle			—	6–3	8–3	—	—	5–2	—	12–5
Charmilles	—	1–2		—	10–8		3–16	—	17–2	—
Empire Ebikon	4–3	—			—	—		—	16–0	—
Esperanza	—	—	—	3–3		2–7	—	—		
Le Parc	—		—	5–5	—		—	7–8	—	4–8
Minerva	—	2–2	—	—	8–1	11–1		9–3		—
Mobulu	6–8	—			7–5	—	—		—	5–8
Peseux Comète	—	0–15	—	—	—	2–21	—			4–8
Salines	4–5	—	11–6	4–3	—	—		—	—	

Updated to match(es) played on 1 November 2026. Source: SFA
Legend: Blue = home team win; Yellow = draw; Red = away team win.

== Championship round ==
Pos	Team	Pld	W	D	L	GF	GA	GD	Pts	Status
1	TBD	0	0	0	0	0	0	0	0	Qualification to the championship play-offs
2	TBD	0	0	0	0	0	0	0	0	Qualification to the championship play-offs
3	TBD	0	0	0	0	0	0	0	0	Qualification to the championship play-offs
4	TBD	0	0	0	0	0	0	0	0	Qualification to the championship play-offs
5	TBD	0	0	0	0	0	0	0	0	
6	TBD	0	0	0	0	0	0	0	0	

Updated to match(es) played on unknown. Source: SFA

== Relegation round ==
Pos	Team	Pld	W	D	L	GF	GA	GD	Pts	Status
1	TBD	0	0	0	0	0	0	0	0	
2	TBD	0	0	0	0	0	0	0	0	
3	TBD	0	0	0	0	0	0	0	0	Relegated to Swiss Futsal Second League
4	TBD	0	0	0	0	0	0	0	0	Relegated to Swiss Futsal Second League

Updated to match(es) played on unknown. Source: SFA
