= 2026–27 Swiss Futsal Women's Premier League =

Swiss Futsal Women's Premier League
- Season: 2026–27
- Dates: 21 November 2026 –
- Matches: 0
- Goals: 0

The 2026–27 Swiss Futsal Women's Premier League is the 6th edition of the Swiss Futsal Women's Premier League, the top-level women's futsal competition in Switzerland. Futsal Minerva are the defending champions.

== Team changes ==
=== Promoted from 2025–26 Futsal Women's Second League ===
- FC Blue Stars ZH Frauen 1968

=== New teams ===
- Cressier Sport 2019 (Team Neuchâtel) (Note: Cressier Sport and Team Neuchâtel competed separately in the 2025–26 Futsal Women's Second League)
- MBL Futsal

=== Excluded teams ===
- Racing Club Lausanne
- The Blues FC

== League table ==
Pos	Team	Pld	W	D	L	GF	GA	GD	Pts	Status
1	Minerva	0	0	0	0	0	0	0	0	Qualification to the championship play-offs
2	Mobulu	0	0	0	0	0	0	0	0	Qualification to the championship play-offs
3	Uni Bulle	0	0	0	0	0	0	0	0	Qualification to the championship play-offs
4	Cressier (Team Neuchâtel)	0	0	0	0	0	0	0	0	Qualification to the championship play-offs
5	Blue Stars	0	0	0	0	0	0	0	0	
6	MBL	0	0	0	0	0	0	0	0	
7	Brühl	0	0	0	0	0	0	0	0	
8	Jester Baden	0	0	0	0	0	0	0	0	
9	Luzern	0	0	0	0	0	0	0	0	
10	Olympique Basel	0	0	0	0	0	0	0	0	Relegation to the Second League

Updated to match(es) played on 1 November 2026. Source: SFA

== Results ==
Home \ Away	BLU	BRU	BUL	CRE	JES	LUZ	MBL	MIN	MOB	OLY
Blue Stars		—	—	—	—		—			
Brühl				—		—		—	—	—
Uni Bulle		—		—		—		—		—
Cressier					—	—	—	—		—
Jester Baden		—	—				—			—
Luzern	—				—		—		—	
MBL		—	—					—		—
Minerva	—				—	—			—	
Mobulu	—		—	—	—		—			
Olympique Basel	—					—		—	—	

Updated to match(es) played on 1 November 2026. Source: SFA
Legend: Blue = home team win; Yellow = draw; Red = away team win.
