= 2016–17 Kazakhstani Futsal Championship =

Kazakhstan Cola Kazakhstani Futsal Championship
- Season: 2016–17
- Champions: Kairat
- Relegated: SDYUSHOR №7
- UEFA Futsal Cup: Kairat
- Matches played: 40
- Goals scored: 364 (9.1 per match)
- Top goalscorer: Eric Nascimento (Ayat) – 24 goals
- Biggest home win: Kairat 21–2 SDYUSHOR №7
- Biggest away win: Zhetysu 2–7 Aktobe
- Highest scoring: Kairat 21–2 SDYUSHOR №7

The 2016–17 season of the Kazakhstan Cola Kazakhstani Futsal Championship is the 19th season of top-tier futsal in Kazakhstan.

== 2016–17 season teams ==
Locations of teams in the 2016-17 Kazakhstan Cola Kazakhstan Futsal Championship

Team	Location	Stadium
Ayat	Rudny	Gornyak Sportcomplex
Aktobe	Aktobe	Konys Sportcomplex
Kairat	Almaty	Kairat Sportcomplex
SDYUSHOR №7	Shymkent	-
Zhetysu	Taldykorgan	Zhastar Sport Palace

== Final table ==
Pos	Team	Pld	W	D	L	GF	GA	GD	Pts	Qualification or relegation
1	Kairat	16	14	1	1	113	24	+89	43	2017–18 UEFA Futsal Cup
2	Ayat	16	9	2	5	78	51	+27	29	
3	Aktobe	16	8	2	6	89	47	+42	26	
4	Zhetysu	16	5	3	8	55	60	−5	18	
5	SDYSHOR №7	16	0	0	16	29	182	−153	0	Relegation to 2017–18 First Division

Updated to match(es) played on 17 April 2017. Source: UEFA – Kazakhstan Cola Kazakhstani Futsal Championship
Rules for classification: 1) points; 2) head-to-head points; 3) head-to-head goal difference; 4) goal difference; 5) number of goals scored

== Top scorers ==
#	Player	Club	Goals
1	(Brazil) Eric Nascimento de Oliveira	Ayat	24
2	(Azerbaijan) Jonathan Luiz Cesar de Angels	Aktobe	16
2	(Kazakhstan) Douglas	Kairat	16
2	(Brazil) Eric Danilo Lopez da Silva	Aktobe	16

== See also ==
- 2016-17 Kazakhstani Futsal First Division
- 2016 Kazakhstan Futsal Cup
