= Fábio Aguiar (futsal player) =

Brazilian futsal player (born 1983)

Personal information
- Full name: Fábio da Rocha Aguiar
- Date of birth: 7 December 1983 (age 42)
- Place of birth: Rio de Janeiro, Brazil
- Height: 1.77 m (5 ft 10 in)
- Positions: Winger; defender

Team information
- Current team: Minerva
- Number: 11

Senior career*
Years	Team	Apps	(Gls)
2004–2005	SC Coimbrões		
2005–2008	Jorge Antunes		
2008	Belenenses		
2009	Jorge Antunes		
2009–2011	Instituto D. João V		
2011–2012	Napoli		
2012–2014	Győri ETO		
2014–2015	Sporting CP	36	(10)
2015–2016	City'US Târgu Mureș		
2016–2017	AEL Limassol		
2017	Győri ETO		
2018–2020	Leões Porto Salvo	45	(18)
2020–	Minerva		

International career^{‡}
2006–2013	Portugal	38	(11)
- * Club domestic league appearances and goals as of 22:00, 16 February 2021 (UTC) ‡ National team caps and goals as of 22:00, 16 February 2021 (UTC)

Fábio da Rocha Aguiar (born 7 December 1983) is a Brazilian born Portuguese futsal player who plays as a winger for Minerva and the Portugal national team.
