= Empire Futsal Club Ebikon =

- Founded: 2016
- League: Swiss Futsal Premier League
- 2025–26: 7th

Empire Futsal Club Ebikon is a Swiss futsal club that currently competes in the Swiss Futsal Premier League.

== History ==
The club was founded on 3 May 2016. They played their first friendly match in October of the same year, before entering into the NLB. In 2024, Empire was promoted to the Swiss Futsal Second League.

One season later, they won promotion to the Swiss Futsal Premier League after finishing as runners-up to Bulle Futsal's. In their first top-level season, Empire finished seventh, at the top of the relegation group.
