= Cristian Marius Matei =

Romanian futsal player

Marius Matei
Personal information
- Full name: Cristian Marius Matei
- Date of birth: 12 March 1987 (age 39)
- Place of birth: Romania
- Position: Winger

Team information
- Current team: AutoBergamo Deva

International career
Years	Team	Apps	(Gls)
- Romania

Cristian Marius Matei (born 12 March 1987), is a Romanian futsal player who plays for AutoBergamo Deva and the Romanian national futsal team.
