= Swiss Futsal Women's Premier League =

- Founded: 2020
- First season: 2021–22
- Country: Switzerland
- Number of clubs: 10
- Level on pyramid: 1
- Relegation to: Swiss Futsal Women's Second League
- Current: 2026–27 Swiss Futsal Women's Premier League

The Swiss Futsal Women's Premier League is the top-level women's futsal league in Switzerland. It was founded in 2020, but the first champion was not crowned until the 2021–22 season due to the COVID-19 pandemic.

== History ==
The league was first introduced in 2020 by the Swiss Football Association. After the first season was cancelled before it began, the 2021–22 season was won by AS Charmilles. The Blues FC won the title in the following 2022–23 season.

== Champions ==
Season	Winner
2021–22	AS Charmilles
2022–23	The Blues FC
2023–24	The Blues FC
2024–25	AS Charmilles
2025–26	Futsal Minerva
2026–27	
