= Futsal Minerva =

- Founded: 2009
- League: Swiss Futsal Premier League; Swiss Futsal Women's Premier League

Futsal Minerva is a Swiss futsal club with teams competing in the Swiss Futsal Premier League and the Swiss Futsal Women's Premier League.

== History ==
The team was founded in 2009 by three university students. Both men and women's teams have seen success at the national level, with each team winning their respective national title in the 2025–26 season.

=== UEFA Champions League ===
The men's club has competed at the UEFA Futsal Champions League several times. In the 2026–27 edition, the team became the first Swiss team to reach the knockout stage of the tournament.
