= Swiss Futsal Premier League =

- Country: Switzerland
- Confederation: UEFA
- Current: 2026–27 Swiss Futsal Premier League

The Swiss Futsal Premier League is the top-level futsal leaguein Switzerland.

== Champions ==
Season	Winner
2006/2007	Uni Futsal Team Bulle
2007/2008	FC Seefeld Zurich
2008/2009	FC Seefeld Zurich
2009/2010	MNK Croatia 97
2010/2011	Geneva Futsal
2011/2012	Futsal Minerva
2012/2013	Futsal Minerva
2013/2014	Uni Futsal Team Bulle
2014/2015	Mobulu Futsal UNI Bern
2015/2016	Futsal Minerva
