= All-time LNFS table =

This All-time LNFS table show one and all of teams who played at some point in División de Honor since its inception in 1989–90 season. División de Honor changed its name in 2011 to Primera División.

The list is incomplete. It will be filled gradually.

== All-time LNFS table ==
Pos	Team	Seasons	Played	Won	Drawn	Lost	G.F.	G.A.	G.D.	Points
1	ElPozo Murcia	26	772	523	103	146	3870	2421	1449	1587
2	Inter Movistar	26	784	525	122	135	3556	2129	1427	1583
3	Playas de Castellón	22	658	375	112	181	2913	2153	760	1145
4	Caja Segovia	24	724	356	121	247	3000	2570	430	1110
5	FC Barcelona	21	624	310	95	219	2377	1961	416	947
6	Marfil Santa Coloma	23	652	257	95	330	2665	2898	−233	802
7	Magna Gurpea	17	514	206	92	216	1892	1909	−17	710
8	Carnicer Torrejón	15	462	172	81	209	1790	1895	−105	597
9	Cartagena	14	430	158	91	181	1538	1634	−96	565
10	CLM Talavera	10	306	200	39	67	1452	941	511	552
11	Santiago	12	352	152	79	121	1267	1162	105	535
12	DLink Zaragoza	14	422	150	72	200	1481	1672	−191	522
13	Prone Lugo	14	416	135	68	213	1286	1644	−358	473
14	Martorell	10	314	136	50	128	1249	1202	47	458
15	Valencia Vijusa	10	316	115	51	145	1142	1268	−126	393
16	Dulma Astorga	12	364	126	56	182	1418	1613	−195	370
17	Caja San Fernando	11	338	117	57	164	1110	1270	−160	350
18	Ourense	8	260	103	38	119	888	962	−74	327
19	Móstoles	8	244	86	50	108	915	1014	−99	308
20	Maspalomas Sol Europa	9	272	110	42	125	982	1055	−73	303
21	Benicarló	8	230	83	44	111	654	728	−74	282
22	Pinturas Lepanto	7	176	95	32	49	735	571	164	256
23	Mejorada/Algón	7	208	91	42	78	740	700	40	230
24	Marsanz Torrejón	6	172	96	29	47	892	631	261	221
25	Palma Futsal	6	172	62	28	82	561	628	−67	214
26	Jaén Paraíso Interior	6	180	63	26	91	611	692	−81	194
27	Sol Fuerza Salamanca	6	200	57	24	119	707	916	−209	183
28	O'Parrulo	5	162	50	24	88	502	682	−180	174
29	Rías Baixas	5	168	44	33	91	490	635	−145	165
30	Ribera Navarra	4	114	46	21	47	350	373	−23	159
31	P. Beltrán Alcantarilla	3	98	52	17	29	395	308	87	151
32	Guadalajara	6	178	37	26	110	534	798	−264	139
33	Gervasport Boadilla	3	90	36	11	43	365	384	−19	119
34	Burela Pescados Rubén	3	84	26	18	40	222	267	−45	96
35	Peñíscola	2	58	19	15	24	173	184	−11	72
36	Talavera	2	60	21	8	31	161	208	−47	71
37	Jumilla B. Carchelo	2	58	20	9	29	209	227	−18	69
38	Barcel Euro Puebla	2	60	16	17	27	234	257	−23	65
39	Pinto	2	58	17	9	32	160	220	−60	60
40	Niquelados Mape	2	50	18	12	20	196	208	−12	48
41	Puertollano	2	56	15	5	36	125	214	−89	46
42	Gran Canaria	3	84	16	6	62	240	383	−143	43
43	Las Rozas Boadilla	1	30	7	5	18	111	129	−18	26
44	Andorra	1	30	7	5	18	95	138	−43	26
45	Levante UD DM	1	30	7	5	18	75	124	−49	26
46	Zamora	1	30	6	4	20	87	122	−35	22
47	Tecuni Bilbo	1	30	5	6	19	94	136	−42	21
48	Cometal Celta de Vigo	1	30	4	7	19	85	131	−46	19
49	Leis Pontevedra	1	30	4	2	24	60	130	−70	14
50	Albacete	1	30	4	1	25	87	155	−68	13
51	Uruguay Tenerife	1	30	3	0	27	72	205	−133	9

- Updated at completion of 2014–15 season.

League or status at 2015–16 season:

Primera División
Segunda División
Segunda División B
Tercera División
Regional divisions
No longer affiliated with RFEF
Club disbanded
