= 2012–13 Copa del Rey de Futsal =

2012–13 Copa del Rey
Tournament details
- Country: Spain
- Teams: 44

Final positions
- Champions: Barcelona Alusport
- Runners-up: ElPozo Murcia

Tournament statistics
- Matches played: 44
- Goals scored: 327 (7.43 per match)
- Top goal scorer: Dani Salgado (9 goals)

The 2012–13 Copa del Rey was the 3rd staging of the Copa del Rey de Futsal. The competition started on October 10, 2012 with the first round and will finish with the final on May 11, 2013. The final was held in Irun, Gipuzkoa, in the Polideportivo Artaleku with a 2,000-seats.

Barcelona Alusport won its third title in a row by defeating 6–3 ElPozo Murcia in the Final.

== Calendar ==
Round	Date	Fixtures	Clubs	Notes
First round	10 October 2012	12	24 → 32	Clubs participating in Segunda División B and six Segunda División teams gain entry.
Round of 32	28 November 2012	16	32 → 16	Segunda División's remaining teams and all Primera División teams gain entry.
Round of 16	19 December 2012	8	16 → 8	
Quarter-finals	16 January 2013	4	8 → 4	
Semifinals	20 March 2013	2	4 → 2	
Semifinals	10 April 2013	2	4 → 2	
Final	May 11, 2013	1	2 → 1	

== Qualified teams ==
- 14 clubs of Primera División
- 12 clubs of Segunda División
- 18 clubs of Segunda División B

== First round ==
The matches will be played on 9 and 10 October 2012.

All times are CEST.

Team 1	Score	Team 2
Sporting San Vicente (Valencian Community)	1–2	(Andalusia) Fuconsa Jaén
Manzanares (Castilla–La Mancha)	3–4	(Region of Murcia) Cartagena
Ategua (Andalusia)	3–2 (a.e.t.)	(Region of Murcia) Montesinos Jumilla
Pinseque (Aragon)	6–3	(Valencian Community) UPV Maristas Valencia
Cover Premià de Mar (Catalonia)	7–5 (a.e.t.)	(Valencian Community) Levante–Dominicos
Kelme Navalagamella (Community of Madrid)	5–7	(Community of Madrid) Carnicer Torrejón
Azulejos Brihuega (Castilla–La Mancha)	2–1	(Castilla–La Mancha) Talavera
Las Cuevecitas (Canary Islands)	6–2	(Canary Islands) Gomera
Nazareno (Andalusia)	9–3	(Ceuta) Unión África Ceutí
L'Hospitalet Bellsport (Catalonia)	3–2	(Catalonia) IGGA Prosperitat
Zierbena (Basque Country (autonomous community))	3–5	(Castile and León) Universidad de Valladolid
Cidade de Narón (Galicia (Spain))	1–3	(Galicia (Spain)) O'Parrulo

=== Matches ===
October 9, 2012	Pinseque	6–3	UPV Maristas Valencia	Pinseque
20:00 (UTC+2)	Cristian 3', 4'; Nacho ?'; Unai ?'; Chulo ?'; Cárdenas ?'	Report	? ?'; Santamarta ?' (o.g.) ? ?'	Stadium: Pabellón Municipal; Referee: Alonso Montesinos, Rubio Fajardo

October 9, 2012	L'Hospitalet Bellsport	3–2	IGGA Prosperitat	L'Hospitalet de Llobregat
20:30 (UTC+2)	David Alba 6', 23'; Mariano García 9'	Report	Alex Peramós 25'; Quimet 37'	Stadium: Poliesportiu Municipal "Sergio Manzano"; Referee: Centeno Bono, Centeno Bono

October 9, 2012	Manzanares	3–4	Cartagena	Manzanares
21:00 (UTC+2)	Chin 17'; Cacho 30'; Ramón 30'	Report	Josiko 3'; Pedreño 16'; Esteban 35'; Blanco 38'	Stadium: Pabellón Polideportivo; Referee: Carpintero Pedrazo, Rodrigo Miguel

October 10, 2012	Nazareno	9–3	Unión África Ceutí	Dos Hermanas
18:30 (UTC+2)	J. Alberto 7', 31'; Aarón 15'; Nene 19'; Migo 24'; Miguel 34'; Julio 37', 38'; Berna 40'	Report	Sufi 9'; Chito 17'; Salvi 29'	Stadium: Pabellón Francisco de Dios Jiménez; Attendance: 500; Referee: Cote García, Elena Pedrós

October 10, 2012	Zierbena	3–5	Universidad de Valladolid	Zierbena
20:00 (UTC+2)	Jorgito 10'; Miguel 25'; Bruno 26'	Report	Adri 16', 18', 38'; Molina 28'; Ofa 34'	Stadium: Polideportivo de Zierbena; Referee: Egia Echearte, Galbarriatu Ramos

October 10, 2012	Azulejos Brihuega	2–1	Talavera	Brihuega
20:15 (UTC+2)	Pepe 8'; Blecua 21'	Report	Nacho Gil 12'	Stadium: Polideportivo Virgen de la Peña; Referee: Duro Bernal, de las Heras Lombilla

October 10, 2012	Kelme Navalagamella	5–7	Carnicer Torrejón	Navalagamella
20:30 (UTC+2)	Werner ?', ?', ?', ?' ? ?'	Report	José Carlos ?'; Caio ?', ?'; Jorge Salcedo ?'; Mendiola ?'; Bingyoba ?'; Zamo ?'	Stadium: Pabellón La Solana; Referee: del Pozo García, Múnez Carpintero

October 10, 2012	Sporting San Vicente	1–2	Fuconsa Jaén	San Vicente del Raspeig
20:30 (UTC+2)	Gabri 38'	Report	Solano 9'; Miguelín 17'	Stadium: Pabellón Municipal; Referee: Hidalgo Marín, Marín Márquez

October 10, 2012	Ategua	3–2 (a.e.t.)	Montesinos Jumilla	Castro del Río
20:45 (UTC+2)	Iván 35'; Ángel 46'; Bollos 49'	Report	Kiwi 10'; Billete 47'	Stadium: Pabellón Municipal; Attendance: 450; Referee: Jiménez Guardeño, Ramos Marín

October 10, 2012	Cover Premià de Mar	7–5 (a.e.t.)	Levante–Dominicos	Premià de Mar
21:00 (UTC+2)	Wesley 9', 36'; Ignasi Solé ?'; Óscar Prieto ?', 39', ?'; David Herraiz ?'	Report	Moisés ?'; Gaspar 28'; Gordillo 32'; Marquez 32' ? 38'	Stadium: Pavelló d'Esports; Referee: Blázquez Sierra, García Donas

October 10, 2012	Cidade de Narón	1–3	O'Parrulo	Narón
21:30 (UTC+2)	Lito 12'	Report	Pana 2', 31'; Víctor 36'	Stadium: Pavillón Polideportivo Gándara; Attendance: 800; Referee: Montero Garrido, González Armada

October 13, 2012	Las Cuevecitas	6–2	Gomera	Candelaria
18:00 (UTC+2)	? ?' ? ?' ? ?' ? ?' ? ?' ? ?'	Report	Ruimán ?'; Bernardo ?'	Stadium: Pabellón Pedro Manuel Brito Guanche; Referee: Delgado Indalecio, García Hernández

Teams qualified to next round
Pinseque	L'Hospitalet Bellsport	Cartagena	Nazareno	Universidad de Valladolid	Azulejos Brihuega
Carnicer Torrejón	Fuconsa Jaén	Ategua	Cover Premià de Mar	O'Parrulo	Las Cuevecitas

== Second round ==
Second round draw took place on October 16 at 12:00 at RFEF headquarters. The second round draw includes all the winners from the first round plus all the Primera División teams and the remaining Segunda División teams who were exempted in the first round.

The matches will be played on 27 and 28 November 2012.

All times are CET.

Team 1	Score	Team 2
Fuconsa Jaén (Andalusia)	3–1	(Region of Murcia) Cartagena
Ategua (Andalusia)	3–2	(Balearic Islands) Fisiomedia Manacor
Pinseque (Aragon)	7–2	(Canary Islands) Colegios Arenas Gáldar
Cover Premià de Mar (Catalonia)	0–5	(Galicia (Spain)) Santiago
Carnicer Torrejón (Community of Madrid)	3–2	(Aragon) Umacon Zaragoza
Azulejos Brihuega (Castilla–La Mancha)	6–5 (a.e.t.)	(Castilla–La Mancha) Puertollano
Las Cuevecitas (Canary Islands)	1–10	(Region of Murcia) ElPozo Murcia
Nazareno (Andalusia)	4–5	(Navarre) Triman Navarra
L'Hospitalet Bellsport (Catalonia)	4–7	(Navarre) Ríos Renovables R.N.
Universidad de Valladolid (Castile and León)	4–6	(Castile and León) Caja Segovia
O'Parrulo (Galicia (Spain))	5–1	(Galicia (Spain)) Azkar Lugo
Uruguay–Tenerife (Canary Islands)	6–0	(Andalusia) UMA Antequera
Melilla	3–2	(Galicia (Spain)) Burela Pescados Rubén
FC Andorra	3–11	(Catalonia) Marfil Santa Coloma
Playas de Castellón (Valencian Community)	1–5	(Community of Madrid) Inter Movistar
Castell de Peñiscola (Valencian Community)	1–9	(Catalonia) FC Barcelona

=== Matches ===
November 1, 2012	Nazareno	4–5	Triman Navarra	Dos Hermanas
12:30 (UTC+1)	Aarón 7', 34'; Miguel 24'; Nene 32'	Report	Eseverri 1'; Jesulito 27', 37'; Ximbinha 34', 38'	Stadium: Pabellón Francisco de Dios Jiménez; Attendance: 1,500; Referee: Elvira Arriaza, Moreno Reina

November 25, 2012	Las Cuevecitas	1–10	ElPozo Murcia	Santa Cruz de Tenerife
12:00 (UTC±0)	Ise 11'	Report	Gréllo 1', 35'; Moisés 3' (o.g.); Adri 3', 23'; Bebe 9', 31'; Paulinho 16', 20'; Álex 28'	Stadium: Palacio Municipal de los Deportes; Attendance: 1,100; Referee: García Hernández, Delgado Indalecio

November 27, 2012	Pinseque	7–2	Colegios Arenas Gáldar	Pinseque
20:00 (UTC+1)	Benito 19', 19', 26'; Chulo 29', 36'; Diego 33'; Santamarta 38'	Report	Néstor 10'; Minhoca 29'	Stadium: Pabellón Municipal; Attendance: 500; Referee: Alonso Montesinos, Faubell Zaldívar

November 27, 2012	Azulejos Brihuega	6–5 (a.e.t.)	Puertollano	Brihuega
20:30 (UTC+1)	Charly 18'; Rubén Marcos 34'; Blecua 40'; Carlos Barrios 43'; Párraga 46'; Pepe 48'	Report	Contreras 17', 27'; Merino 23', 47', 50'	Stadium: Polideportivo Virgen de la Peña; Attendance: 800; Referee: Gracia Marín, Múnez Carpintero

November 27, 2012	FC Andorra	3–11	Marfil Santa Coloma	Andorra la Vella
20:30 (UTC+1)	Jorge 30'; Xuxa ?'; Hicham ?'	Report	Rubén 6'; Adolfo 6'; Dani Salgado 8', 10', 15', ?', ?', 24', ?'; Alex del Barco ?'; Jhow ?'	Stadium: Poliesportiu d'Andorra; Referee: Pons Rodríguez, Sarrat Nuevo

November 27, 2012	L'Hospitalet Bellsport	4–7	Ríos Renovables R.N.	L'Hospitalet de Llobregat
20:30 (UTC+1)	Pau López 16'; Juan Carlos López 26'; David Alba 27'; Carlos Anós 37' (o.g.)	Report	Jonathan 7'; Charlie 13'; Lolo 29'; Carlos Anós 33'; Nano Modrego 34', 38'; Prieto 39'	Stadium: Poliesportiu Municipal "Sergio Manzano"; Attendance: 200; Referee: Blázquez Sierra, García Donas

November 27, 2012	O'Parrulo	5–1	Azkar Lugo	Ferrol
20:30 (UTC+1)	Jacobo 3', 7'; Pana 30', 40'; Cagi 39'	Report	Bruninho 24'	Stadium: Pavillón Municipal A Malata; Attendance: 600; Referee: Cid Bragado, Martínez Torres

November 27, 2012	Carnicer Torrejón	3–2	Umacon Zaragoza	Torrejón de Ardoz
20:45 (UTC+1)	Kita 21'; Kike 23'; Caio 38'	Report	Víctor Tejel 3'; Alvarito 17'	Stadium: Pabellón Jorge Garbajosa; Attendance: 1,000; Referee: Del Pozo García, López Jiménez

November 27, 2012	Cover Premià de Mar	0–5	Santiago	Premià de Mar
21:00 (UTC+1)		Report	Hamza 3'; Jorge 19'; Raúl Campos 39'; Barroso 39'; Hugo 40'	Stadium: Pavelló d'Esports; Referee: Bel Pascual, Moreno Millán

November 27, 2012	Fuconsa Jaén	3–1	Cartagena	Jaén
21:00 (UTC+1)	Miguelín 2'; Lolo Jarque 21'; Miguel Ángel Ureña 36'	Report	Pedreño 33'	Stadium: Pabellón La Salobreja; Attendance: 700; Referee: Casanova Peragón, Ramos Marín

November 28, 2012	Universidad de Valladolid	4–6	Caja Segovia	Valladolid
20:00 (UTC+1)	Miguel Santiago 5', 20'; Adri 18'; Javi López 22'	Report	Fabián 14', 16'; Palomeque 19', 27'; Sergio 24'; Murga 28'	Stadium: Pabellón Fuente de la Mora; Attendance: 800; Referee: Pérez Álvarez, García Morón

November 28, 2012	Melilla	3–2	Burela Pescados Rubén	Melilla
20:30 (UTC+1)	Lonchu 10'; Yoni 31'; Fernán 38'	Report	Dani Martín 4'; Mimi 8'	Stadium: Pabellón Javier Imbroda Ortiz; Attendance: 250; Referee: Peña Díaz, Peña Gómez

November 28, 2012	Ategua	3–2	Fisiomedia Manacor	Castro del Río
20:45 (UTC+1)	Bollos 26', 26'; Ángel 32'	Report	Rubén 1'; Vadillo 9'	Stadium: Pabellón Municipal de Deportes; Attendance: 1,000; Referee: Casanova Peragón, Jiménez Guardeño

November 28, 2012	Playas de Castellón	1–5	Inter Movistar	Castellón de la Plana
20:45 (UTC+1)	Campoy 28'	Report	Rafael 5'; Pola 13'; Matamoros 16'; Batería 21'; Eka 39'	Stadium: Pabellón Ciutat De Castelló; Attendance: 1,500; Referee: Rabadán Sainz, Sánchez Ayala

November 28, 2012	Castell de Peñiscola Benicarló	1–9	FC Barcelona	Benicarló
21:00 (UTC+1)	Marc Tolrá 28' (o.g.)	Report	Sergio Lozano 10'; Wilde 17', 18', 28', 29'; Martel 22'; Marc Tolrá 35'; Igor 38', 40'	Stadium: Pabellón Municipal de Benicarló; Attendance: 1,200; Referee: Bernabéu Haro, González Ruano

Teams qualified to next round
Triman Navarra	Uruguay–Tenerife	ElPozo Murcia	Pinseque	Azulejos Brihuega	Marfil Santa Coloma	Ríos Renovables R.N.	O'Parrulo
Carnicer Torrejón	Santiago	Fuconsa Jaén	Caja Segovia	Melilla	Ategua	Inter Movistar	FC Barcelona

== Final stages ==
Round of 16
Melilla	1
FC Barcelona Alusport	3
Carnicer Torrejón	4
Caja Segovia	2
Brihuega	2
Inter Movistar	9
Uruguay Tenerife	3
Marfil Santa Coloma	6
Fuconsa Jaén	2
Triman Navarra	5
Pinseque	4
Santiago	9
7	O'Parrulo	3
ElPozo Murcia	7
Ategua	1
Ríos Renovables R.N.	2

Quarter-finals
FC Barcelona Alusport	3
Carnicer Torrejón	1
Inter Movistar	8
Marfil Santa Coloma	6
Triman Navarra	2
Santiago	3
ElPozo Murcia	4
Ríos Renovables R.N.	1

Semi-finals
FC Barcelona Alusport	5	3	8
Inter Movistar	0	3	3
Santiago	1	0	1
ElPozo Murcia	4	5	9

Final
FC Barcelona Alusport	6
ElPozo Murcia	3

=== Third round ===
Third round or round of 16 draw took place on December 4 at 12:00 at RFEF headquarters. The third round draw includes the winners from the second round which in summary are eight teams from Primera División, four from Segunda División and four from Segunda División B. At the same time was made the draw for quarterfinals and semifinals.

The matches will be played on 18 and 19 December 2012.

All times are CET.

Team 1	Score	Team 2
Fuconsa Jaén (Andalusia)	2–5	(Navarre) Triman Navarra
Azulejos Brihuega (Castilla–La Mancha)	2–9	(Community of Madrid) Inter Movistar
Carnicer Torrejón (Community of Madrid)	4–2	(Castile and León) Caja Segovia
Uruguay–Tenerife (Canary Islands)	3–6	(Catalonia) Marfil Santa Coloma
Ategua (Andalusia)	1–2	(Navarre) Ríos Renovables R.N.
Melilla	1–3	(Catalonia) FC Barcelona Alusport
O'Parrulo (Galicia (Spain))	3–7	(Region of Murcia) ElPozo Murcia
Pinseque (Aragon)	4–9	(Galicia (Spain)) Santiago

==== Matches ====
December 18, 2012	Pinseque	4–9	Santiago	Pinseque
20:00 (UTC+1)	Jesús Benito 16'; Unai 17', 35', 38'	Report	Alan 3', 4', 17'; Raúl Campos 19', 35', 39', 40'; Diego Quintela 27', 29'	Stadium: Pabellón Municipal; Attendance: 1,000; Referee: Alonso Montesinos, Santander Flamarique

December 18, 2012	Azulejos Brihuega	2–9	Inter Movistar	Brihuega
20:30 (UTC+1)	Párraga 6'; Blecua 18'	Report	Betão 9', 36'; Pola 29', 31'; Rivillos 34'; Eka 34'; Matamoros 37', 37'; Batería 39'	Stadium: Polideportivo Virgen de la Peña; Attendance: 500; Referee: Heras Lombilla, Ponce Medero

December 18, 2012	Carnicer Torrejón	4–2	Caja Segovia	Torrejón de Ardoz
20:30 (UTC+1)	Kita 9'; Chino 33'; Kike 34'; Kiki 38'	Report	David 1'; José Carlos 16'	Stadium: Pabellón Jorge Garbajosa; Attendance: 400; Referee: Gutiérrez Lumbreras, Lope Díaz

December 18, 2012	O'Parrulo	3–7	ElPozo Murcia	Ferrol
20:30 (UTC+1)	Jacobo 6'; Bebeto 33', 34'	Report	Gréllo 3'; Juampi 8'; Álex 10', 25', 36'; Suazo 27'; Adri 39'	Stadium: Pavillón Municipal A Malata; Attendance: 3,000; Referee: Martínez Torres, Montero Garrido

December 18, 2012	Ategua	1–2	Ríos Renovables R.N.	Castro del Río
20:45 (UTC+1)	Koseky 25'	Report	Nano Modrego 30', 38'	Stadium: Pabellón Municipal de Deportes; Attendance: 900; Referee: Moreno Reina, Ramos Marín

December 19, 2012	Fuconsa Jaén	2–5	Triman Navarra	Jaén
20:30 (UTC+1)	Sergio García 4', 27'	Report	Jesulito 3', 22'; Víctor Arevalo 7'; Javi Eseverri 37'; Rafa Usín 38'	Stadium: Pabellón La Salobreja; Attendance: 700; Referee: Peña Diaz, Peña Gomez

December 19, 2012	Uruguay–Tenerife	3–6	Marfil Santa Coloma	Tenerife
20:30 (UTC±0)	Álex 18'; Jacinto 30'; Mikel 39'	Report	Jhow 13'; Adolfo 13', 39'; Dani Salgado 17'; Rafa López 36', 36'	Stadium: Palacio Municipal de Deportes; Attendance: 450; Referee: Díaz Rodríguez, García Hernández

December 19, 2012	Melilla	1–3	FC Barcelona Alusport	Melilla
21:15 (UTC+1)	Rafita 13'	Report	Sergio Lozano 5', 24', 27'	Stadium: Pabellón Javier Imbroda Ortiz; Attendance: 3,800; Referee: Cuesta Sánchez, García Moron

Teams qualified to next round
Santiago	Inter Movistar	Carnicer Torrejón	ElPozo Murcia
Ríos Renovables R.N.	Triman Navarra	Marfil Santa Coloma	FC Barcelona Alusport

=== Quarterfinals ===
Matches to be played on 15 & 16 January 2013, playing as home team the lowest ranked team in 2011–12 Primera División, (regular season standings).

All times are CET.

Team 1	Score	Team 2
Triman Navarra (Navarre)	2–3	(Galicia (Spain)) Santiago
Marfil Santa Coloma (Catalonia)	6–8	(Community of Madrid) Inter Movistar
Carnicer Torrejón (Community of Madrid)	1–3	(Catalonia) FC Barcelona Alusport
Ríos Renovables R.N. (Navarre)	1–4	(Region of Murcia) ElPozo Murcia

==== Matches ====
January 15, 2013	Carnicer Torrejón	1–3	FC Barcelona Alusport	Torrejón de Ardoz
20:30 (UTC+1)	Caio 18'	Report	Aicardo 1'; Torras 4'; Ari 10'	Stadium: Pabellón Jorge Garbajosa; Attendance: 1,700; Referee: Ponce Medero, Munez Carpintero

January 15, 2013	Marfil Santa Coloma	6–8	Inter Movistar	Santa Coloma de Gramenet
20:30 (UTC+1)	Jhow 7', 32'; Adolfo 14', 33', 34'; Dani Salgado 38'	Report	Borruto 11', 19'; Rafael 21', 23'; Eka 22', 36'; Rivillos 27', 28'	Stadium: Pavelló Jacint Verdaguer; Attendance: 2,400; Referee: Blázquez Sierra, García Donas

January 16, 2013	Ríos Renovables R.N.	1–4	ElPozo Murcia	Tudela
20:30 (UTC+1)	Nano Modrego 12'	Report	Miguelín 1', 32'; Álex 39', 40'	Stadium: Polideportivo Ciudad de Tudela; Attendance: 1,500; Referee: Sanzol Goñi, Sierra Márquez

January 16, 2013	Triman Navarra	2–3	Santiago	Pamplona
20:30 (UTC+1)	Rafa Usín 33'; Javi Eseverri 39'	Report	David 3', 32'; Diego Quintela 30'	Stadium: Pabellón Anaitasuna; Attendance: 1,400; Referee: Felipe Madorrán, Gereta Ramírez

Teams qualified to next round
FC Barcelona Alusport	Inter Movistar
ElPozo Murcia	Santiago

=== Semifinals ===
First leg matches to be played on 19 & 20 March and second leg matches on 9 & 10 April.

All times are CET.

Team 1	Agg.	Team 2	1st leg	2nd leg
FC Barcelona Alusport (Catalonia)	8–3	(Community of Madrid) Inter Movistar	5–0	3–3
ElPozo Murcia (Region of Murcia)	9–1	(Galicia (Spain)) Santiago	4–1	5–0

==== Matches ====
===== 1st leg =====
March 19, 2013	ElPozo Murcia	4–1	Santiago	Murcia
12:00 (UTC+1)	Gréllo 9'; Paulinho 17'; Kike 25'; Miguelín 40'	Report	Quintela 30'	Stadium: Palacio de Deportes; Attendance: 3,200; Referee: Peña Díaz, Peña Gómez

March 19, 2013	FC Barcelona Alusport	5–0	Inter Movistar	Barcelona
21:00 (UTC+1)	Lin 1'; Sergio Lozano 4', 38'; Torras 18'; Rivillos 21' (o.g.)	Report		Stadium: Palau Blaugrana; Attendance: 2,384; Referee: González Ruano, Sánchez Ayal

===== 2nd leg =====
April 10, 2013	Inter Movistar	3–3 (8–3 agg.)	FC Barcelona Alusport	Alcalá de Henares
21:00 (UTC+2)	Borruto 13'; Batería 33', 39'	Report	Sergio Lozano 10'; Saad 10'; Wilde 20'	Stadium: Pabellón Caja Madrid; Attendance: 3,800; Referee: Contreras Tejedor, Viedma Martín

April 10, 2013	Santiago	0–5 (9–1 agg.)	ElPozo Murcia	Santiago de Compostela
21:00 (UTC+2)		Report	Álex 22', 27'; Gréllo 30'; Lolo Suazo 32'; Bebe 39'	Stadium: Fontes do Sar; Attendance: 2,000; Referee: Gallo Suárez, Velasco Martínez

Teams qualified to Final
FC Barcelona Alusport
ElPozo Murcia

=== Final ===
The final will be played on 11 May at the Polideportivo Artaleku in Irun, Gipuzkoa, Basque Country.

May 11, 2013	FC Barcelona Alusport	6–3	ElPozo Murcia	Irun
21:00 (UTC+2)	Torras 3'; Sergio Lozano 10'; Gabriel 11', 34'; Igor 11'; Aicardo 15'	Report	Paulinho 16'; Lolo Suazo 26'; Kike 29'	Stadium: Polideportivo Artaleku; Attendance: 1,800; Referee: Sanzol Goñi, Urdánoz Apezteguía

2012–13 Copa del Rey de Futsal winners
(Catalonia)
FC Barcelona Alusport
Third title

== Top scorers ==
Last updated: May 11.

Rank	Player	Club	R1	R2	R3	QF	SF1	SF2	F	Total
1	(Spain) Dani Salgado	Marfil Santa Coloma	–	7	1	1				9
2	(Spain) Álex	ElPozo Murcia	–	1	3	2	0	2		8
2	(Spain) Sergio Lozano	FC Barcelona Alusport	–	1	3	0	2	1	1	8
4	(Spain) Adolfo	Marfil Santa Coloma	–	1	2	3				6
5	(Brazil) Gréllo	ElPozo Murcia	–	2	1	0	1	1		5
5	(Spain) Nano Modrego	Ríos Renovables R.N.	–	2	2	1				5
5	(Spain) Raúl Campos	Santiago	–	1	4					5
5	(Brazil) Wilde	FC Barcelona Alusport	–	4	0	0	0	1		5

Source: own compilation

== See also ==
- 2012–13 Primera División de Futsal
- 2012 Copa de España de Futsal
