= Javi Sánchez (futsal player) =

Spanish futsal player

Personal information
- Full name: Javier Sánchez Franco
- Date of birth: 25 January 1971 (age 55)
- Place of birth: Cáceres, Spain
- Position: Pivot

Senior career*
Years	Team	Apps	(Gls)
1991–1993	Extremadura		
1993–1994	Playas de Castellón		
1994–1995	Zaragoza		
1995–2003	Playas de Castellón		

International career
- Spain
- * Club domestic league appearances and goals

Javier Sánchez Franco (born 25 January 1971), commonly known as Javi Sánchez, is a former Spanish futsal player, best known for his time with Playas de Castellón and the Spain national futsal team.
