= 1999–2000 División de Honor de Futsal =

División de Honor
- Season: 1999–00
- Champions: Playas de Castellón
- Relegated: Cefire Burela, Sol Fuerza Salamanca & Fórum Filatélico R. Baixas
- European Championship: Playas de Castellón
- Matches played: 306
- Goals scored: 2,468 (8.07 per match)
- Top goalscorer: Joan, 68 goals
- Biggest home win: Airtel Boomerang 13–0 O'Parrulo Indunor
- Biggest away win: Mínguez Sáez Cartagena 3–10 Playas de Castellón
- Highest scoring: Playas de Castellón 15–4 Miró Martorell

The 1999–00 season of the División de Honor de Futsal is the 11th season of top-tier futsal in Spain.

== Regular season ==
=== League table ===
Title Play-Off
Relegation

P	Team	Pld	W	D	L	GF	GA	Pts
1	Playas de Castellón	34	30	2	2	204	88	92
2	Caja Segovia	34	24	6	4	156	102	78
3	CLM Talavera	34	24	5	5	174	110	77
4	ElPozo Murcia	34	23	4	7	147	110	73
5	Airtel Boomerang	34	21	8	5	168	95	71
6	O Parrulo Indunor	34	19	3	12	134	137	60
7	Ourense	34	17	4	13	148	138	55
8	C. DRY Fiat Torrejón	34	15	4	15	147	152	49
9	Mínguez Sáez Cartagena	34	12	7	15	122	135	43
10	MRA Ingeteam Xota	34	13	2	19	144	157	41
11	Industrias García	34	13	1	20	150	158	40
12	Foticos Zaragoza	34	13	1	20	130	148	40
13	Dulma Astorga	34	11	4	19	109	141	37
14	Miró Martorell	34	11	3	20	126	159	36
15	Caja San Fernando Jerez	34	9	6	19	108	148	33
16	Fórum Filatélico R. Baixas	34	6	3	25	103	159	21
17	'Sol Fuerza Salamanca	34	7	0	27	87	141	21
18	Cefire Burela	34	6	1	27	107	186	19

*At end of season, CLM Talavera's seat was sold to Azkar Lugo.

== Playoffs ==
quarter-finals
Playas de Castellón	2	12	_
Café Dry Fiat Torrejón	0	2	_
ElPozo Murcia	8	4	4
Airtel Boomerang	5	9	6
Caja Segovia	3	5	_
Ourense	1	4	_
CLM Talavera	6	8	_
O'Parrulo Indunor	2	2	_

semifinals
Playas de Castellón	6	3	_
Airtel Boomerang	0	1	_
Caja Segovia	5	6	_
CLM Talavera	8	7	_

final
Playas de Castellón	4	5	3
CLM Talavera	1	3	2

1999–2000 División de Honor winners
(Valencian Community)
Playas de Castellón
First title

== Goalscorers ==
Player	Goals	Team
Joan	68	CLM Talavera
Edesio	66	Playas de Castellón
Paulo Roberto	66	ElPozo Murcia
Andreu	49	CLM Talavera
Vinicius	48	Airtel Boomerang
Daniel	47	Caja Segovia
Afranio	44	MRA Ingeteam Xota
Javi Rodríguez	41	Playas de Castellón
Cupim	40	Playas de Castellón
Kel	39	Dulma Astorga

== See also ==
- División de Honor de Futsal
- Futsal in Spain
