= 1997–98 División de Honor de Futsal =

División de Honor
- Season: 1997–98
- Champions: ElPozo Murcia
- Relegated: Ourense & Barcelona. (Zaragoza disqualified)
- European Championship: ElPozo Murcia
- Matches played: 306
- Goals scored: 2,075 (6.78 per match)
- Top goalscorer: Joan Linares, 57 goals
- Biggest home win: ElPozo Murcia 11–3 Seat Martorell
- Biggest away win: Boomerang Interviú 4–10 ElPozo Murcia
- Highest scoring: Industrias García 12–7 Carnicer Fiat Torrejón

The 1997–98 season of the División de Honor de Futsal is the 10th season of top-tier futsal in Spain.

== Regular season ==
=== League table ===
Title Play-Off
Relegation

P	Team	Pld	W	D	L	GF	GA	Pts
1	Caja Segovia	32	23	6	3	125	77	75
2	ElPozo Murcia	32	23	5	4	174	95	74
3	Boomerang Interviú	32	23	4	5	160	102	73
4	CLM Talavera	32	21	3	8	165	97	66
5	Playas de Castellón	32	18	6	8	135	91	60
6	Caja San Fernando Jerez	32	13	7	12	105	104	46
7	Industrias García	32	13	6	13	141	146	45
8	Yumas Vijusa	32	13	5	14	124	132	44
9	Carnicer Fiat Torrejón	32	12	5	15	131	140	41
10	Rías Baixas	32	12	4	16	116	125	40
11	Maspalomas Costa Canaria	32	11	5	16	90	106	38
12	SEAT Martorell	32	11	3	18	94	132	36
13	Dulma Astorga	32	9	5	18	107	129	32
14	Jaén Paraíso Interior	32	9	3	20	117	157	30
15	Sol Fuerza Salamanca	32	9	2	21	99	140	29
16	Ourense	32	7	4	21	95	143	25
17	Barcelona	32	7	3	22	97	159	24
18	Zaragoza	0	0	0	0	0	0	0

*Zaragoza, disqualified for a two non-appearance in a row. Later, the club disappeared.

== Playoffs ==
quarter-finals
Caja San Fernando	3	6	_
Boomerang Interviú	4	6	_
Industrias García	6	2	_
ElPozo Murcia	7	4	_
Playas de Castellón	6	2	3
CLM Talavera	4	5	4
Yumas Valencia	1	0	_
Caja Segovia	6	4	_

semifinals
Boomerang Interviú	2	3
ElPozo Murcia	4	6
CLM Talavera	2	5
Caja Segovia	2	2

final
ElPozo Murcia	5	4	2	4	4
CLM Talavera	0	2	5	5	2

1997–98 División de Honor winners
(Region of Murcia)
ElPozo Murcia
First title

== Goalscorers ==
Player	Goals	Team
Joan Linares	57	CLM Talavera
Paulo Roberto	50	ElPozo Murcia
Edesio	45	Boomerang Interviú
Richard	41	Carnicer Fiat Torrejón
Cupim	41	ElPozo Murcia
Daniel	38	Caja Segovia
Fran	37	Industrias García
Javi Rodríguez	36	Playas de Castellón
Marcelo	37	ElPozo Murcia
Martín	34	Maspalomas Costa Canaria
Fran	34	ElPozo Murcia

== See also ==
- División de Honor de Futsal
- Futsal in Spain
