= Joan Linares =

Spanish futsal player

Personal information
- Full name: Joan Linares Rodríguez
- Date of birth: 24 February 1975 (age 51)
- Place of birth: Barcelona, Spain
- Position: Pivot

Team information
- Current team: FS Valdepeñas

Senior career*
Years	Team	Apps	(Gls)
1993–1995	Barcelona	—	(22)
1995–2000	CLM Talavera	—	(257)
2000–2002	Playas de Castellón	—	(93)
2002–2008	Inter Movistar	265	(174)
2008–2011	Talavera	76	(71)
2011–2012	Sala 10	35	(28)
2012–	FS Valdepeñas		

International career
	Spain	73	
- * Club domestic league appearances and goals

Joan Linares Rodríguez (born 24 February 1975), commonly known as Joan, is a Spanish futsal player who plays as Pívot en el FS Valdepeñas de segunda división de la LNFS.

== Honors ==
- 6 División de Honor de Futsal (96/97, 00/01, 02/03, 03/04, 04/05, 07/08)
- 3 Copa de España de Futsal (03/04, 04/05, 06/07)
- 4 Intercontinental Futsal Cup (2005, 2006, 2007, 2008)
- 5 Supercopa de España de Futsal (01/02, 02/03, 03/04, 05/06, 07/08)
- 5 UEFA Futsal Cup (1998, 2001, 2002, 2004, 2006)
- 1 Recopa de Europa (2008)
- 2 Iberian Cup (03/04, 05/06)
- 1 FIFA Futsal World Cup (2000)
- 1 UEFA Futsal Championship(Russia 2001)
- 2 Four Nations Tournament (Netherlands 96, Spain 97)
- Champion FIFA Tournament (Singapur 01)
- Champion Torneo Centenario Real Madrid (Torrejón 02)
- 1 MVP of LNFS (99/00)
- 1 Best Pívot of LNFS (99/00)
- 4 Best Left Flank of LNFS (95 to 99)
- 2 Top scorer División de Honor LNFS (97/98, 99/00)
- 1 Top scorer División de Plata (08/09)
