= 1989–90 División de Honor de Futsal =

División de Honor
- Season: 1989–90
- Champions: Interviú
- Relegated: see tables
- European Championship: Interviu Lloyd's
- Matches played: 588
- Goals scored: 4,793 (8.15 per match)

The 1989–90 season of the División de Honor de Futsal was the 1st season of top-tier futsal in Spain.

== Regular season ==
=== First round ===
==== Group A ====
2nd Round
Relegated

P	Team	Pld	W	D	L	GF	GA	Pts
1	Interviú Lloyd's	22	18	1	3	152	71	37
2	Marsanz Torrejón	22	16	3	3	133	67	35
3	Algón	22	15	5	5	101	61	32
4	Muebles El Norte	22	13	4	5	96	93	30
5	A.E.P.	22	10	6	6	80	68	26
6	Garvey Jerez	22	13	0	9	77	72	26
7	M. Obrero Aquasierra	22	8	2	12	27	76	18
8	Paz y Cia	22	6	3	13	74	87	15
9	CajaCeuta Alminatour	22	5	3	14	62	111	13
10	Ejido Intersemillas	22	4	5	13	79	110	13
11	Rioja Bordón	22	5	2	15	67	107	12
12	Cajasur Córdoba	22	2	3	17	63	118	7

==== Group B ====
2nd Round
Relegated

P	Team	Pld	W	D	L	GF	GA	Pts
1	Keralite Macer	22	15	6	1	114	62	36
2	Conservas Ojeda	22	15	2	5	151	82	32
3	La Garriga	22	14	4	4	141	64	32
4	EPozo Murcia	22	12	5	5	121	94	29
5	Niquelados Mape	22	12	4	6	110	74	28
6	Valverde	22	10	7	5	108	80	27
7	Construcciones Débora	22	10	6	6	97	89	26
8	Buades Electricista	22	8	6	8	78	68	22
9	Big Ben Lleida	22	3	6	13	56	93	12
10	Almuñecar Costa Tropical	22	4	4	14	64	121	10
11	Burriana	22	3	1	18	64	136	7
12	Ibiza Ceserco	22	0	1	21	36	177	1

==== Group C ====
2nd Round
Relegated

P	Team	Pld	W	D	L	GF	GA	Pts
1	Balnul Castellón	22	18	3	1	119	41	39
2	Barcelona	22	16	3	3	140	52	35
3	Bazar Sport	22	14	5	3	110	59	33
4	Alzira	22	13	2	7	84	65	28
5	Agramont	22	12	2	8	107	83	26
6	Industrias García	22	11	4	7	114	92	26
7	L'Hospitalet	22	10	4	8	93	87	24
8	Europcar Leioa	22	9	1	12	56	101	19
9	Náutic	22	4	2	16	68	141	10
10	G.M. Pyrenées	22	3	4	15	78	131	10
11	Muelles Bultzaki	22	2	4	16	60	114	8
12	Sestao Sport	22	2	2	18	68	131	6

==== Group D ====
2nd Round
Relegated

P	Team	Pld	W	D	L	GF	GA	Pts
1	Redislogar Cotransa	22	18	2	2	130	49	38
2	La Bañeza Hotachy	22	14	2	6	88	71	30
3	Caja Segovia	22	12	5	5	115	70	29
4	Egasa Chastón	22	14	1	7	101	50	29
5	Dulma Astorga	22	12	4	6	120	84	28
6	Teka Santander	22	12	4	6	105	99	28
7	T. Cega	22	13	0	9	92	85	26
8	Fontaine P.C.H.	22	9	1	12	63	89	19
9	Gran Casino	22	6	0	16	100	131	12
10	Mieres	22	5	1	16	85	150	11
11	Boandanza R. Tívoli	22	3	2	17	75	119	8
12	C.A.R 88 Cáceres	22	2	2	18	58	135	4^{(1)}

^{(1)} 2 penalty points

=== Second round ===
==== Group A ====
Playoffs

P	Team	Pld	W	D	L	GF	GA	Pts
1	Interviú Lloyd's	10	8	2	0	42	24	18
2	Caja Segovia	10	5	2	3	35	29	12
3	Conservas Ojeda	10	4	3	3	44	37	11
4	Redislogar Cotransa	10	4	2	4	31	32	10
5	Algón	10	2	2	6	22	32	6
6	Barcelona	10	1	1	8	20	40	3

==== Group B ====
Playoffs

P	Team	Pld	W	D	L	GF	GA	Pts
1	Keralite Macer	10	7	1	2	36	21	15
2	Marsanz Torrejón	10	6	2	2	49	38	14
3	L&W La Garriga	10	5	1	4	48	35	11
4	Balnul Castellón	10	4	1	5	33	32	9
5	La Bañeza Hotachy	10	2	2	6	22	46	6
6	Bazar Sport	10	2	1	7	31	47	5

== Playoffs ==
semifinals
Interviu Lloyd's	7	5	_
Marsanz Torrejón	5	5	_
Keralite Macer	4	6	_
Caja Segovia	3	0	_

final
Interviu Lloyd's	5	4	_
Keralite Macer	4	3	_

1989–90 División de Honor winners
(Community of Madrid)
Interviú Lloyd's
First title

== See also ==
- División de Honor de Futsal
- Futsal in Spain
