= 1998–99 División de Honor de Futsal =

División de Honor
- Season: 1998–99
- Champions: Caja Segovia
- Relegated: Maspalomas Costa Canaria, Jaén Paraíso Interior & Valencia Vijusa
- European Championship: Caja Segovia
- Matches played: 306
- Goals scored: 2,379 (7.77 per match)
- Top goalscorer: Edesio, 53 goals
- Biggest home win: Industrias García 12–3 O'Parrulo
- Biggest away win: ElPozo Murcia 1–10 Playas de Castellón
- Highest scoring: O'Parrulo 10–7 Sol Fuerza Salamanca

The 1998–99 season of the División de Honor de Futsal is the 10th season of top-tier futsal in Spain.

== Regular season ==
=== League table ===
Title Play-Off
Relegation

P	Team	Pld	W	D	L	GF	GA	Pts
1	Playas de Castellón	34	25	7	2	185	91	82
2	CLM Talavera	34	23	8	3	157	90	77
3	Caja Segovia	34	24	4	6	150	99	76
4	Boomerang Interviú	34	21	7	6	145	83	70
5	Industrias García	34	18	2	14	147	142	56
6	ElPozo Murcia	34	15	5	14	137	131	50
7	Miró Martorell	34	14	4	16	116	125	46
8	Fórum Filatélico	34	11	10	13	102	112	43
9	C. DRY Fiat Torrejón	34	12	6	16	117	114	42
10	Dulma Astorga	34	12	5	17	113	135	41
11	Sol Fuerza Salamanca	34	12	4	18	120	137	40
12	Caja San Fernando Jerez	34	10	9	15	98	118	39
13	O'Parrulo Indunor	34	10	9	15	110	138	39
14	Mínguez Sáez Cartagena	34	10	8	16	95	122	38
15	MRA Xota	34	11	3	20	149	178	36
16	Valencia Vijusa	34	9	8	17	104	128	35
17	Jaén Paraíso Interior	34	10	4	20	105	137	34
18	Maspalomas Costa Canaria	34	5	5	24	89	159	20

== Playoffs ==
quarter-finals
Playas de Castellón	9	9	_
Forum Filatélico	2	5	_
Boomerang Interviú	5	4	_
Industrias García	6	11	_
CLM Talavera	4	5	_
Miró Martorell	3	4	_
Caja Segovia	7	4	_
ElPozo Murcia	3	2	_

semifinals
Playas de Castellón	2	4	_
Industrias García	3	7	_
CLM Talavera	8	2	3
Caja Segovia	6	8	3

final
Industrias García	5	4	2
Caja Segovia	6	5	5

1998–99 División de Honor winners
(Castile and León)
Caja Segovia
First title

== Goalscorers ==
Player	Goals	Team
Edesio	53	Playas de Castellón
Marcelo	53	Industrias García
Serpa	51	Caja Segovia
Daniel	49	Caja Segovia
Joan	40	CLM Talavera
Preguinho	39	O'Parrulo Indunor
Leandro	34	MRA Xota
Javi Santos	33	Forum Filatélico
Fran Torres	32	Playas de Castellón
Cupim	32	Playas de Castellón
Javi Rodríguez	32	Playas de Castellón

== See also ==
- División de Honor de Futsal
- Futsal in Spain
