= Eder Sarabia =

Spanish football manager (born 1981)

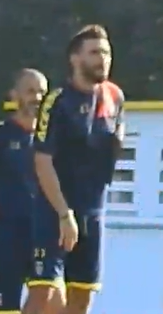
- Sarabia as an assistant of Las Palmas in 2016

Personal information
- Full name: Eder Sarabia Armesto
- Date of birth: 12 January 1981 (age 45)
- Place of birth: Bilbao, Spain
- Height: 1.79 m (5 ft 10 in)
- Position: Forward

Team information
- Current team: Espanyol (manager)

Youth career
- Arenas Getxo

Senior career*
Years	Team	Apps	(Gls)
2000–2002	Arenas Getxo B		
2002–2003	San Pedro		
2003	Leioa		
2003	Indautxu		
2003–2004	Gazteluzarra		
2004	Somorrostro		
2004–2005	Ugeraga		
2005	Gallarta		

Managerial career
- 2003–2005: Cruces (youth)
- 2005–2011: Danok Bat (youth)
- 2011–2013: Villarreal (youth)
- 2013: Villarreal C
- 2015–2017: Las Palmas (assistant)
- 2017–2019: Betis (assistant)
- 2020: Barcelona (assistant)
- 2021–2024: Andorra
- 2024–2026: Elche
- 2026–: Espanyol
- * Club domestic league appearances and goals

Eder Sarabia Armesto (born 12 January 1981) is a Spanish football manager and former player who played as a forward. He is the current manager of RCD Espanyol.

After an amateur playing career, he was Quique Setién's assistant at three clubs including Barcelona, before leading Andorra to the Segunda División as head coach.

== Playing career ==
Born in Bilbao, Biscay, Basque Country, Sarabia only played amateur football during his entire career; he played for SD Indautxu, SD Leioa, SD San Pedro and Arenas Club de Getxo's reserve team before retiring at the age of 24. He never played higher than the Tercera División.

== Coaching career ==
=== Early career ===
Sarabia began his coaching career in 2003 with CFD Cruces' Infantil squad, and then worked at Danok Bat CF's youth categories.

In 2011, Sarabia moved to Villarreal CF, after being appointed manager of the Infantil side. After being in charge of the Juvenil squad in the 2012–13 campaign, he was named manager of the C-team on 1 October 2013, replacing Tito García Sanjuán.

Sarabia was sacked by the Yellow Submarine on 12 November 2013, after only one win in seven matches. In the following year, he led a Real Madrid academy project in the Dominican Republic.

=== Assistant to Quique Setién ===
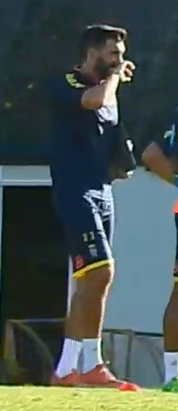
Sarabia during a training session as an assistant of Las Palmas in 2016

In October 2015, Sarabia joined Quique Setién's staff after being named his assistant at UD Las Palmas. He followed Setién to Real Betis and FC Barcelona, again as his assistant.

While at Barcelona, Sarabia was pointed out by the media as the main reason of a relationship problem between the players and the coaching staff, being spotted often by the match cameras criticising the players in matches; Lionel Messi ignored him during a match against RC Celta de Vigo. He later admitted an argument between the squad and the staff after that match.

=== Andorra ===
On 18 January 2021, Sarabia was appointed manager of FC Andorra in Segunda División B, after agreeing to a two-and-a-half-year contract. After losing the promotion playoff semi-final in his first season to Real Sociedad B, he achieved promotion from the new Primera Federación in 2022, despite losing the final 3–0 to Racing de Santander; that December, he extended his contract to 2025. In his and Andorra's first match in the Segunda División on 15 August, the team won 1–0 at Real Oviedo with a goal by Pau Casadesús.

On 25 March 2024, following a poor run of results which saw Andorra sitting bottom of the league, Sarabia was sacked.

=== Elche ===
On 24 June 2024, Sarabia was named in charge of fellow second division side Elche CF, after agreeing to a one-year contract. The following 10 June, after achieving promotion to La Liga, he renewed his link until 2027.

In the 2025–26 season, Sarabia led Elche to an unbeaten start through the first seven league matches, finishing September in fourth place. This run marked the best start to a season in the club's history and earned him the LaLiga Coach of the Month award for September.

On 27 May 2026, after avoiding relegation, Sarabia resigned from the Franjiverdes.

=== Espanyol ===
On 28 October 2026, Sarabia was appointed manager of RCD Espanyol also in the top tier, signing a contract until 2028.

== Personal life ==
Sarabia's father Manuel was also a footballer and a forward who played for Athletic Bilbao and CD Logroñés.

== Managerial statistics ==
As of 20 November 2026

Managerial record by team and tenure
Team	Nat	From	To	Record								Ref
Team	Nat	From	To	G	W	D	L	GF	GA	GD	Win %	Ref
Villarreal C	(Spain)	1 October 2013	12 November 2013	7	1	2	4	13	17	−4	14.29	
FC Andorra	(Andorra)	18 January 2021	25 March 2024	134	53	31	50	160	141	+19	39.55	
Elche CF	(Spain)	24 June 2024	27 May 2026	88	38	24	26	124	98	+26	43.18	
Espanyol	(Spain)	28 October 2026	Present	3	2	1	0	2	0	+2	66.67	
Total				232	94	58	80	299	256	+43	40.52	—

== Honours ==
=== Managerial ===
- La Liga Manager of the Month: September 2025
