= FS Martorell =

Spanish futsal club

Martorell
- Full name: Futbol Sala Martorell
- Founded: 1985
- Dissolved: 2011
- Ground: Pavelló Municipal, Martorell, Catalonia
- Capacity: 2,000
- 2010–11: 1ª Nacional A, Retired
Home colours	Away colours

Fútbol Sala Martorell was a futsal club based in Martorell, province of Barcelona, Catalonia, Spain.

The club was founded in 1985 and played at the Pavelló Municipal with a capacity of 2,000.

The club was sponsored by the Ajuntament of Martorell.

== Season to season ==
Season	Division	Place	Copa de España
1991/92	1ª Nacional B	2nd	
1992/93	1ª Nacional B	1st	
1993/94	1ª Nacional A	1st	
1994/95	D. Plata	3rd	
1995/96	D. Plata	3rd	
1996/97	D. Plata	1st	
1997/98	D. Honor	12th	
1998/99	D. Honor	7th	
1999/00	D. Honor	14th	
2000/01	D. Honor	9th	

Season	Division	Place	Copa de España
2001/02	D. Honor	3rd	
2002/03	D. Honor	3rd	
2003/04	D. Honor	4th	
2004/05	D. Honor	9th	
2005/06	D. Honor	4th	
2006/07	D. Honor	15th	
2007/08	1ª Nacional A	6th	
2008/09	1ª Nacional A	3rd	
2009/10	1ª Nacional A	11th	
2010/11	1ª Nacional A	Retired	

- 10 seasons in División de Honor
- 3 seasons in División de Plata
- 4 seasons in 1ª Nacional A
- 2 seasons in 1ª Nacional B

== Notable players ==
- (Spain) Jordi Torras
- (Brazil) Fernandao
