= Pinto FS =

Spanish futsal club

Punctum Millenium Pinto
- Full name: Pinto Fútbol Sala
- Nickname: --
- Founded: 1988
- Dissolved: 2010
- Ground: Pabellón Municipal, Pinto; Spain
- Capacity: 5,000
- 2009–10: División de Honor, 16th
Home colours	Away colours

Pinto Fútbol Sala was a futsal club based in Pinto, city of the autonomous community of Community of Madrid.

The club was founded in 1988 and her pavilion is Municipal de Pinto with capacity of 5,000 seaters.

The club was sponsored by Ayuntamiento de Pinto.

== Season to season ==
Season	Division	Place	Copa de España
2003/04	1ª Nacional A	1st	
2004/05	D. Plata	6th	
2005/06	D. Plata	9th	
2006/07	D. Plata	9th	
2007/08	D. Plata	2nd	
2008/09	D. Honor	6th	
2009/10	D. Honor	16th	

- 2 season in División de Honor
- 4 seasons in División de Plata
- 1 season in 1ª Nacional A

== Last squad ==
- 1 (Spain) Álex
- 2 (Spain) Pedreño
- 4 (Brazil) Chaguinha
- 5 (Brazil) Serpa
- 6 (Spain) Damián
- 7 (Spain) Pizarro
- 8 (Spain) Gonzalo
- 10 (Spain) Zamo
- 11 (Spain) Kiki
- 12 (Spain) Javi Alonso
- 13 (Spain) Ángel
- 14 (Spain) Tomás
- 16 (Spain) Antoñito
- 17 (Spain) Chino
