= Ourense FS =

Spanish futsal club

Ourense
- Full name: Ourense Fútbol Sala
- Nickname(s): --
- Founded: 1981
- Ground: Paco Paz, Ourense, Galicia, Spain
- Capacity: 5,500
- Chairman: José Luis Gómez
- Manager: Marcial López
- League: 1ª Provincial de Ourense
- 2013–14: 1ª Provincial de Ourense, 11th
| Home colours | Away colours |

Ourense Fútbol Sala is a futsal club based in Ourense, city of the province of Ourense in the autonomous community of Galicia.

The club was founded in 1981 and her pavilion is Pazo dos Deportes Paco Paz with capacity of 6,000 seaters.

From 2009–10 to 2011–12 season, the club only played with youth teams, returning the senior team to futsal activity in 2012–13 season.

== Season to season ==
| Season | Tier | Division | Place | Copa de España |
|---|---|---|---|---|
| 1990/91 | 3 | 1ª Nacional B | 1st | |
| 1991/92 | 2 | 1ª Nacional A | 2nd | |
| 1992/93 | 2 | 1ª Nacional A | 1st | |
| 1993/94 | 1 | D. Honor | 10th | |
| 1994/95 | 1 | D. Honor | 9th | |
| 1995/96 | 1 | D. Honor | 7th | |
| 1996/97 | 1 | D. Honor | 8th | |
| 1997/98 | 1 | D. Honor | 16th | |
| 1998/99 | 2 | D. Plata | 1st | |
| 1999/00 | 1 | D. Honor | 7th | |
| 2000/01 | 1 | D. Honor | 5th | |

| Season | Tier | Division | Place | Copa de España |
|---|---|---|---|---|
| 2001/02 | 1 | D. Honor | 15th | |
| 2002/03 | 2 | D. Plata | 3rd | |
| 2003/04 | 2 | D. Plata | 7th | |
| 2004/05 | 2 | D. Plata | 5th | |
| 2005/06 | 2 | D. Plata | 6th | |
| 2006/07 | 2 | D. Plata | 3rd | |
| 2007/08 | 2 | D. Plata | 16th | |
| 2008/09 | 3 | 1ª Nacional A | 9th | |
| 2012/13 | 7 | 2ª Provincial | 6th | |
| 2013/14 | 6 | 1ª Provincial | 11th | |

- 8 seasons in Primera División
- 7 seasons in Segunda División
- 3 seasons in Segunda División B
- 1 seasons in Tercera División
