= Futsal European Clubs Championship =

The Futsal European Clubs Championship was an annual futsal competition for European club teams. It was introduced in 1984 and discontinued after the 2000–01 season, when it was replaced by the UEFA Futsal Cup.

== Results ==
Season	Host city	Winner	Runner-up	Score	Third place
1984–85; Details	(Italy) Viterbo	(Belgium) ZVC Hoboken	(Netherlands) FC Kras Boys	3–3 (4–3 pen.)	(Spain) Egasa Chaston
1985–86; Details	(Italy) Rome	(Netherlands) Drei Keuninge	(Belgium) ZVK Hasselt	3–3 (4–3 pen.)	(Italy) Roma Barilla
1986–87; Details	(Netherlands) Maastricht	(Denmark) Næstved IF	(Belgium) ZVK Hasselt	7–0	(Italy) Ortana Griphus
1987–88; Details	(Socialist Federal Republic of Yugoslavia) Titovo Velenje	(Belgium) ZVK Ford Genk	(Netherlands) FC Kras Boys	4–0 (in the round-robin)	(Hungary) Keszthely
1988–89; Details	(Hungary) Debrecen	(Socialist Federal Republic of Yugoslavia) MNK Uspinjača	(Socialist Federal Republic of Yugoslavia) MNK Kutina	3–0	(Hungary) Debreceni MVSC and (Hungary) Tatabanyai Banyasz
1989–90; Details	(Italy) Rome	(Italy) Roma RCB	(Spain) La Garriga Isolar	2–1	(Belgium) ZVK Hasselt
1990–91; Details	(Spain) Madrid	(Spain) Interviú Lloyd's	(Portugal) AR Freixieiro	7–0	(Socialist Federal Republic of Yugoslavia) MNK Seljak Livno
1991–92	Not played				
1992–93	Not played				
1993–94; Details	(Spain) Madrid	(Spain) Marsanz Torrejón	(Croatia) MNK Uspinjača	11–3	(Belgium) ZVK Hasselt and (Russia) Dina Moskva
1994–95; Details	(Spain) Maspalomas	(Russia) Dina Moskva	(Spain) Maspalomas Sol Europa	6–5	(Italy) Torrino S.C. and (Belgium) ZVK Hasselt
1995–96; Details	(Italy) Rome	(Italy) BNL Calcetto Roma	(Spain) Pinturas Lepanto Zaragoza	5–4	(Russia) Dina Moskva
1996–97; Details	(Russia) Moscow	(Russia) Dina Moskva	(Italy) BNL Calcetto Roma	2–2 (7–6 pen.)	(Spain) Interviu Boomerang
1997–98; Details	(Spain) Talavera	(Spain) CLM Talavera	(Russia) Dina Moskva	3–3 (5–4 pen.)	(Italy) BNL Calcetto Roma and (Croatia) MNK Split
1998–99; Details	(Russia) Moscow	(Russia) Dina Moskva	(Italy) Lazio Calcio a 5	2–1	(Spain) ElPozo Murcia
1999–00; Details	(Spain) Segovia	(Spain) Caja Segovia	(Italy) BNL Calcetto Roma	4–1	(Russia) Dina Moskva
2000–01; Details	(Spain) Castellón	(Spain) Playas de Castellón	(Russia) Dina Moskva	4–2	(Italy) AS Genzano

There weren't 3rd place game in the 1988–89, 1993–94, 1994–95 and 1997–98 seasons. The clubs that lost in the semi-finals or took the 2nd place in their groups are marked.

In the 1987–88 season, places were determined based on the results of a round robin tournament.

== Performance by nation ==
Nation	Winners	Runners-up	Third	Winning clubs
Spain	5	3	3	Interviú Lloyd's, Marsanz Torrejón, CLM Talavera, Caja Segovia, Playas de Castellón
Russia	3	2	2	Dina Moskva (3)
Italy	2	3	5	Roma RCB, BNL Calcetto Roma
Belgium	2	2	2	ZVC Hoboken, ZVK Ford Genk
Netherlands	1	2	0	Drei Keuninge
Yugoslavia	1	1	1	MNK Uspinjača
Denmark	1	0	0	Næstved IF
Croatia	0	1	0	
Portugal	0	1	0	
Hungary	0	0	2	

== Medals (1984-2001) ==
Rank	Nation	Gold	Silver	Bronze	Total
1	Spain	5	3	3	11
2	Russia	3	2	2	7
3	Italy	2	3	5	10
4	Belgium	2	2	2	6
5	Netherlands	1	2	0	3
6	Yugoslavia	1	1	1	3
7	Denmark	1	0	0	1
8	Croatia	0	1	0	1
8	Portugal	0	1	0	1
10	Hungary	0	0	2	2
Totals (10 entries)		15	15	15	45
