= List of futsal clubs in Spain =

List of futsal clubs in Spain sorted by division:

== Primera División 2012/13 season ==
- Primera División clubs

== Segunda División 2012/13 season ==
- Segunda División clubs

== Primera División Femenina 2012/13 season ==
- Primera División Femenina clubs

== See also ==
- Futsal in Spain
