= 2000–01 División de Honor de Futsal =

División de Honor
- Season: 2000–01
- Champions: Playas de Castellón
- Relegated: Caja San Fernando Jerez & Dulma Astorga
- UEFA Futsal Cup: Playas de Castellón
- Matches played: 306
- Goals scored: 2,415 (7.89 per match)
- Top goalscorer: Paulo Roberto, 72 goals
- Biggest home win: Playas de Castellón 17–3 Industrias García
- Biggest away win: Móstoles 3–12 Caja Segovia
- Highest scoring: Playas de Castellón 17–3 Industrias García

The 2000–01 season of the División de Honor de Futsal is the 12th season of top-tier futsal in Spain.

== Regular season ==
=== League table ===
Pos	Team	Pld	W	D	L	GF	GA	GD	Pts	Qualification or relegation
1	Playas de Castellón	34	26	5	3	165	83	+82	83	Title Play-Off
2	Valencia Vijusa	34	24	2	8	166	104	+62	74	Title Play-Off
3	ElPozo Murcia	34	22	2	10	155	123	+32	68	Title Play-Off
4	Antena 3 Boomerang	34	20	4	10	130	105	+25	64	Title Play-Off
5	Forum Ourense	34	18	8	8	139	103	+36	62	Title Play-Off
6	Caja Segovia	34	18	6	10	189	142	+47	60	Title Play-Off
7	C. DRY Fiat Torrejón	34	17	5	12	173	150	+23	56	Title Play-Off
8	Industrias García	34	15	3	16	123	151	−28	48	Title Play-Off
9	Miró Martorell	34	15	3	16	140	138	+2	48	
10	Móstoles	34	13	6	15	143	148	−5	45	
11	GMI Cartagena	34	13	4	17	125	140	−15	43	
12	O Parrulo Ferrol	34	12	6	16	121	132	−11	42	
13	Foticos Zaragoza	34	13	1	20	133	160	−27	40	Relegation play-off
14	Café Candelas Lugo	34	12	4	18	113	147	−34	40	Relegation play-off
15	FC Barcelona	34	11	6	17	123	140	−17	39	Relegation play-off
16	MRA Ingeteam Xota	34	8	6	20	102	128	−26	30	Relegation play-off
17	Caja San Fernando Jerez	34	7	4	23	85	138	−53	25	Relegation
18	Dulma Astorga	34	4	1	29	89	182	−93	13	Relegation

== Playoffs ==
=== Championship playoffs ===
quarter-finals
Playas de Castellón	9	4
Industrias García	3	6
Antena 3 Boomerang	2	4	_
Forum Ourense	1	2	_
Valencia Vijusa	9	5	6
Café Dry Fiat Torrejón	1	6	3
ElPozo Murcia	4	1	6
Caja Segovia	3	4	4

semifinals
Playas de Castellón	7	2	4
Antena 3 Boomerang	2	3	3
Valencia Vijusa	6	7
ElPozo Murcia	5	6

final
Playas de Castellón	6	3	3	3	_
Valencia Vijusa	2	1	7	0	_

2000–01 División de Honor winners
(Valencian Community)
Playas de Castellón
Second title

=== Relegation playoff ===
relegation playoff
Foticos Zaragoza	7	5	2	_
MRA Ingeteam Xota	2	6	4	_

- Foticos Zaragoza relegated to División de Plata.

relegation playoff
Café Candelas Lugo	3	3	_
FC Barcelona	3	6	_

- Café Candelas Lugo relegated to División de Plata.

== Goalscorers ==
- As day 30 of 30

Player	Goals	Team
Paulo Roberto	72	ElPozo Murcia
Marcelo	54	Industrias García
Fran Espinosa	52	C. DRY Fiat Torrejón
Javi Rodríguez	44	Playas de Castellón
Javi Matía	42	GMI Cartagena
Joan	41	Playas de Castellón
Kike	40	Valencia Vijusa
Fede	39	Valencia Vijusa
Riquer	38	Caja Segovia
Álvaro	35	Caja Segovia

== See also ==
- División de Honor de Futsal
- Futsal in Spain
