= Rafa Fernández =

Spanish futsal player

Personal information
- Full name: Rafael Fernández Pérez
- Date of birth: 13 June 1980 (age 46)
- Place of birth: Valencia, Spain
- Position: Goalkeeper

Team information
- Current team: ElPozo Murcia

Senior career*
Years	Team	Apps	(Gls)
1999–2003	Valencia	68	(1)
2003–2005	Playas de Castellón	68	(0)
2005–2008	Boomerang Interviu	54	(1)
2008–2010	Playas de Castellón	53	(1)
2010–	ElPozo Murcia	52	(0)

International career
- Spain
- * Club domestic league appearances and goals

Rafael Fernández Pérez (born 13 June 1980), commonly known as Rafa, is a Spanish futsal player who plays for ElPozo Murcia as a goalkeeper.
