= 1993–94 División de Honor de Futsal =

División de Honor
- Season: 1993–94
- Champions: Maspalomas Sol Europa
- Relegated: Canava Jaén, Extremadura, E.Palacios/Lehoi, Galdar Tecnasa, Tenerife C. Toscal & Podeprom El Ejido
- European Championship: Maspalomas Sol Europa
- Matches played: 384
- Biggest home win: Caja Segovia 12–1 Podep. Ejido
- Biggest away win: Tenerife C. Toscal 4–11 Depor-Sala
- Highest scoring: E.Palacios/Lehoi 8–10 Astorga

The 1993–94 season of the División de Honor de Futsal is the 5th season of top-tier futsal in Spain. It was divided in two rounds. First round divided in two groups of 12 teams every one, and second round in which advanced the best 6 team of every group. The 4 last teams of every group played the Permanence round.

== Regular season ==
=== 1st round ===
==== Group Par ====
Second round
Permanence round

P	Team	Pld	W	D	L	GF	GA	Pts
1	Caja Castilla La Mancha	22	15	5	2	120	60	35
2	Maspalomas Sol Europa	22	13	3	6	91	71	29
3	Playas de Castellón	22	13	2	7	86	76	28
4	Mejorada	22	13	2	7	78	64	28
5	Univ. de Salamanca	22	12	2	8	99	92	26
6	Pinturas Lepanto	22	10	5	7	91	69	25
7	Deporsala	22	11	3	8	122	103	25
8	Caja San Fernando Jerez	22	8	2	12	81	89	18
9	Canava Jaén	22	6	3	13	70	103	15
10	G. Academia Postal	22	5	3	14	48	83	13
11	Industrias García	22	5	1	16	97	123	11
12	Tenerife C. Toscal	22	5	1	16	55	105	11

==== Group Impar ====
Second round
Permanence round

P	Team	Pld	W	D	L	GF	GA	Pts
1	Interviú Boomerang	22	16	3	3	97	46	35
2	ElPozo Murcia	22	15	5	2	100	61	35
3	Marsanz Torrejón	22	14	4	4	117	75	32
4	Barcelona	22	11	5	6	79	53	27
5	Linasa/Alcantarilla	22	11	3	8	104	93	25
6	Hojaldres Alonso Astorga	22	11	2	9	112	99	24
7	Caja Segovia	22	9	4	9	100	91	22
8	Egasa Coruña	22	7	5	10	76	75	19
9	Gáldar Tecnasa	22	9	1	12	82	97	19
10	Extremadura	22	6	2	14	63	103	14
11	Podeprom El Ejido	22	3	1	18	41	123	7
12	L. Regui/E. Palacios	22	2	1	19	59	114	5

=== 2nd round ===
==== Title – Group Par ====
Playoffs

P	Team	Pld	W	D	L	GF	GA	Pts
1	Caja Castilla La Mancha	10	7	1	2	47	26	15
2	Barcelona	10	6	1	3	38	31	13
3	ElPozo Murcia	10	6	1	3	40	34	13
4	Hojaldres Alonso Astorga	10	4	2	4	52	54	10
5	Playas de Castellón	10	3	1	6	48	52	7
6	Univ. de Salamanca	10	0	2	8	35	63	2

==== Title – Group Impar ====
Playoffs

P	Team	Pld	W	D	L	GF	GA	Pts
1	Maspalomas Sol Europa	10	9	1	0	64	31	19
2	Pinturas Lepanto	10	6	1	3	40	28	13
3	Mejorada	10	3	3	4	28	29	9
4	Interviú Boomerang	10	4	1	5	33	33	9
5	Marsanz Torrejón	10	3	1	6	36	50	7
6	Linasa/Alcantarilla	10	0	3	7	25	55	3

==== Permanence – Group Par ====
relegated

P	Team	Pld	W	D	L	GF	GA	Pts
1	Industrias García	10	7	1	2	42	29	15
2	Deporsala	10	5	2	3	46	30	12
3	Egasa Coruña	10	5	1	4	26	28	11
4	Canava Jaén	10	3	3	4	37	37	9
5	Extremadura	10	4	1	5	31	46	9
6	L. Regui/E. Palacios	10	0	4	6	29	41	4

==== Permanence – Group Impar ====
relegated

P	Team	Pld	W	D	L	GF	GA	Pts
1	Caja San Fernando Jerez	8	5	1	2	32	25	11
2	Caja Segovia	8	5	0	3	47	38	10
3	G. Academia Postal	8	3	3	2	27	22	9
4	Gáldar Tecnasa	8	2	1	5	36	42	5
5	Tenerife C. Toscal	8	2	1	5	17	32	5
6	Podeprom El Ejido	0	0	0	0	0	0	0

- Podeprom El Ejido withdrawn of the competition.

== Playoffs ==
semifinals
Caja Castilla-La Mancha	1	4	_
P. Lepanto/Zaragoza	1	2	_
Maspalomas Sol Europa	7	3
Barcelona	4	3

final
Caja Castilla-La Mancha	4	1	2
Maspalomas Sol Europa	4	1	5

1993–94 División de Honor winners
(Canary Islands)
Maspalomas Sol Europa
First title

== See also ==
- División de Honor de Futsal
- Futsal in Spain
