= Astorga FS =

Defunct futsal club in Spain

Dulma Astorga
- Full name: Astorga Fútbol Sala
- Nickname(s): --
- Founded: 1977
- Dissolved: 2001
- Ground: Felipe Miñambres, Astorga, Castile and León, Spain
- Capacity: 2,000
- 2000–01: División de Honor, 18th
| Home colours | Away colours |

Astorga Fútbol Sala was a futsal club based in Astorga, Castile and León.

The team played on pavilion Felipe Miñambres with capacity of 3,000 seats.

== Sponsors ==
- Dulma Astorga – Dulma, sweets and desserts. – 1989–90, 1998–99, 1999–00 and 2000–01.
- Industriales de Astorga – 1991–92
- Ediciones Lara Astorga – 1992–93
- Hojaldres Alonso Astorga – 1993–94, 1994–95
- M.A. Astorga – 1995–96

== History ==
- The club was founded in 1977. The club was twice semifinalist of Copa de España. At end of 2000–01 season, due to the limitations economic, the seat of Astorga FS was sold to Ruta Leonesa FS.

== Season to season ==
| Season | Division | Place | Copa de España |
|---|---|---|---|
| 1989/90 | D. Honor | 5th | |
| 1990/91 | D. Honor | 5th | |
| 1991/92 | D. Honor | 9th | |
| 1992/93 | D. Honor | 8th | |
| 1993/94 | D. Honor | 6th | |
| 1994/95 | D. Honor | 2nd | |

| Season | Division | Place | Copa de España |
|---|---|---|---|
| 1995/96 | D. Honor | 10th | |
| 1996/97 | D. Honor | 11th | |
| 1997/98 | D. Honor | 13th | |
| 1998/99 | D. Honor | 10th | |
| 1999/00 | D. Honor | 13th | |
| 2000/01 | D. Honor | 18th | |

- 12 seasons in División de Honor

== Honours ==
- Copa de España: 0
  - Semifinals: 1989–90, 1994–95 and 1998–99
