= 1994–95 División de Honor de Futsal =

División de Honor
- Season: 1994–95
- Champions: Pinturas Lepanto Zaragoza
- Relegated: Torrejón & Egasa Coruña
- European Championship: Interviú Boomerang
- Matches played: 296
- Biggest home win: Interviú Boomerang 14–2 La Massana
- Biggest away win: Sol Fuerza 3–11 Alcantarilla
- Highest scoring: Sol Fuerza 8–9 Interviú Boomerang

The 1994–95 season of the División de Honor de Futsal is the 6th season of top-tier futsal in Spain. It was divided in two rounds. First round divided in two groups of 10 teams every one, and second round in which advanced the best 6 team of every group. The 4 last teams of every group played the Permanence round.

== Regular season ==
=== 1st round ===
==== Group Par ====
Second round
Permanence round

P	Team	Pld	W	D	L	GF	GA	Pts
1	ElPozo Murcia	18	12	4	2	87	43	28
2	Pinturas Lepanto	18	13	2	3	83	58	28
3	Industrias García	18	11	1	6	69	62	23
4	Papeles Beltrán Alcantarilla	18	9	4	5	69	52	22
5	Interviú Boomerang	18	9	2	7	72	57	20
6	Vijusa Valencia	18	7	0	11	62	84	14
7	Maspalomas Sol Europa	18	6	2	10	56	69	14
8	Torrejón	18	5	3	10	71	86	13
9	G. Academia Postal	18	4	1	13	44	66	9
10	M. Leganés	18	4	1	13	38	74	9

==== Group Impar ====
Second round
Permanence round

P	Team	Pld	W	D	L	GF	GA	Pts
1	Caja Castilla La Mancha	18	12	3	3	93	54	27
2	Hojaldres Alonso Astorga	18	9	4	5	66	56	22
3	Playas de Castellón	18	8	6	4	68	48	22
4	Caja Segovia	18	9	2	7	82	76	20
5	Barcelona	18	7	6	5	66	61	20
6	Mejorada	18	9	2	7	63	59	20
7	Jerez	18	8	2	8	70	82	18
8	Sol Fuerza El Adelante	18	6	4	8	78	81	16
9	Arinsal-Pal Massana	18	4	3	11	57	82	11
10	Egasa Coruña	18	2	0	16	41	85	4

=== 2nd round ===
==== Group Title ====
Playoffs

P	Team	Pld	W	D	L	GF	GA	Pts
1	Interviú Boomerang	10	7	1	2	44	29	15
2	Mejorada	10	7	1	2	38	26	15
3	ElPozo Murcia	10	7	0	3	44	24	14
4	Caja Segovia	10	5	1	4	42	35	11
5	Hojaldres Alonso Astorga	10	1	1	8	25	54	3
6	Industrias García	10	1	0	9	37	62	2

==== Group Title ====
Playoffs

P	Team	Pld	W	D	L	GF	GA	Pts
1	Pinturas Lepanto	10	7	3	0	52	29	17
2	Playas de Castellón	10	5	3	2	34	32	13
3	Barcelona	10	4	3	3	34	27	11
4	Caja Castilla La Mancha	10	3	4	3	23	23	10
5	Papeles Beltrán Alcantarilla	10	2	2	6	17	30	6
6	Vijusa Valencia	10	1	1	8	23	42	3

==== Permanence group ====
relegated

P	Team	Pld	W	D	L	GF	GA	Pts
1	G. Academia Postal	14	8	2	4	43	46	18
2	Maspalomas Sol Europa	14	8	1	5	57	44	17
3	Jerez	14	7	2	5	61	46	16
4	Sol Fuerza El Adelanto	14	6	4	4	58	59	16
5	M. Leganés	14	5	5	4	43	42	15
6	Arinsal-Pal Massana	14	6	2	6	41	37	14
7	Torrejón	14	3	4	7	38	59	10
8	Egasa Coruña	14	1	4	9	20	28	0

Egasa Coruña, 6 points deducted

== Playoffs ==
semifinals
Playas de Castellón	0	0	_
Interviú Boomerang	2	3	_
Mejorada	1	3	_
P. Lepanto Zaragoza	4	4	_

final
Interviú Boomerang	3	3	4
P. Lepanto Zaragoza	1	4	6

1994–95 División de Honor winners
(Aragon)
P. Lepanto Zaragoza
First title

== See also ==
- División de Honor de Futsal
- Futsal in Spain
