= 1990–91 División de Honor de Futsal =

División de Honor
- Season: 1990–91
- Champions: Interviu Lloyd's
- Relegated: Andorra, Muebles El Norte, Kalise, La Bañeza, Niquelados Mape & A.E.P.
- European Championship: Interviu Lloyd's
- Matches played: 336
- Goals scored: 2,944 (8.76 per match)

The 1990–91 season of the División de Honor de Futsal was the 2nd season of top-tier futsal in Spain. It was played in two rounds. At first round teams were divided in two groups of 12 teams every one, advancing eight first to second round for title. Four last advanced to second round for permanence.

== Regular season ==
=== 1st round ===
==== Group Par ====
Second round
Permanence round

P	Team	Pld	W	D	L	GF	GA	Pts
1	Pennzoil Marsanz	22	15	2	5	145	73	32
2	Caja Toledo	22	15	2	5	105	67	32
3	Redislogar Cotransa	22	12	6	4	97	70	30
4	Caja Segovia	22	12	4	6	142	97	28
5	Astorga	22	8	9	5	97	96	25
6	Barcelona	22	10	4	8	81	86	24
7	Sando Ciudad de Málaga	22	10	3	9	94	98	23
8	Las Palmas	22	7	4	11	78	104	18
9	Egasa Chastón	22	5	5	12	85	112	15
10	Niquelados Mape	22	4	5	13	73	121	13
11	A.E.P.	22	4	5	13	63	87	13
12	Muebles El Norte	22	5	1	16	64	113	11

==== Group Impar ====
Second round
Permanence round

P	Team	Pld	W	D	L	GF	GA	Pts
1	Macer Almazora	22	15	4	3	126	59	34
2	Interviú Lloyd's	22	16	2	4	154	97	34
3	Algón	22	15	3	4	104	73	33
4	Balnul Nules	22	14	3	5	99	58	31
5	Gran Canaria	22	12	6	4	110	80	30
6	La Garriga	22	11	4	7	111	101	26
7	Vidrios Levante	22	10	4	8	110	96	24
8	ElPozo Murcia	22	5	6	11	92	90	16
9	Industrias García	22	8	0	14	84	108	16
10	Kalise	22	3	3	16	94	151	9
11	Andorra	22	3	2	17	90	138	8
12	La Bañeza	22	1	1	20	56	179	3

=== 2nd round ===
==== Title – Group A ====
Playoffs

P	Team	Pld	W	D	L	GF	GA	Pts
1	Algón	6	3	2	1	19	15	8
2	Interviú Lloyd's	6	2	2	2	29	32	6
3	Marsanz Torrejón	6	2	2	2	27	25	6
4	Caja Segovia	6	2	0	4	33	36	4

==== Title – Group B ====
Playoffs

P	Team	Pld	W	D	L	GF	GA	Pts
1	Almazora	6	4	1	1	33	21	9
2	Redislogar Cotransa	6	4	0	2	29	20	8
3	Caja Toledo	6	2	0	4	23	30	4
4	Balnul Nules	6	1	1	4	17	31	3

==== Title – Group C ====
Playoffs

P	Team	Pld	W	D	L	GF	GA	Pts
1	Vidrios Levante	6	5	0	1	32	22	10
2	Baybor La Garriga	6	4	1	1	31	16	9
3	Astorga	6	2	1	3	26	27	5
4	Las Palmas	6	0	0	6	16	40	0

==== Title – Group D ====
Playoffs

P	Team	Pld	W	D	L	GF	GA	Pts
1	Sumarsa	6	4	1	1	31	22	9
2	Sando C. Málaga	6	4	0	2	26	28	8
3	ElPozo Murcia	6	2	0	4	21	24	4
4	Barcelona	6	1	1	4	20	24	3

==== Relegation – Group E ====
relegated

P	Team	Pld	W	D	L	GF	GA	Pts
1	Egasa Chastón	6	4	1	1	34	27	9
2	Andorra	6	3	1	2	17	22	7
3	Muebles El Norte	6	2	1	3	27	27	5
4	Kalise	6	1	1	4	32	34	2

==== Relegation – Group F ====
relegated

P	Team	Pld	W	D	L	GF	GA	Pts
1	Industrias García	6	3	2	1	23	12	8
2	La Bañeza	6	3	1	2	19	18	7
3	Niquelados Mape	6	2	3	1	13	13	7
4	A.E.P.	6	0	2	4	12	24	2

== Playoffs ==
quarter-finals
Sumarsa	3	2	_
Algón	3	5	_
Redislogar Cotransa	1	3	8
Marsanz Torrejón	3	2	9
Caja Toledo	2	2	_
Interviú Lloyd's	3	2	_
Vidrios Levante	1	1	_
Almazora	3	5	_

semifinals
Algón	3	2	2
Marsanz Torrejón	9	1	5
Interviú Lloyd's	3	5	3
Almazora	6	4	1

final
Marsanz Torrejón	8	6	4
Interviú Lloyd's	7	7	6

1990–91 División de Honor winners
(Community of Madrid)
Interviú Lloyd's
Second title

== See also ==
- División de Honor de Futsal
- Futsal in Spain
