= Ruta Leonesa FS =

Spanish futsal club

Ruta Leonesa
- Full name: Ruta Leonesa Fútbol Sala
- Nickname(s): --
- Founded: 1983
- Dissolved: 2010
- Ground: Palacio de los Deportes, León; Spain
- Capacity: 7,000
- Chairman: (Spain) Román Flórez
- Manager: (Spain) Roberto Garrido
- 2009–10: División de Plata, 6th
Home colours	Away colours

Ruta Leonesa Fútbol Sala was a futsal club based in León, city of the province of León in the autonomous community of Castile and León.

The club was founded in 1983 and her stadium is Estadio Palacio de los Deportes with capacity of 7,000 seaters.

Their main sponsor were Obras y Estructuras RAM.

In August 2010, the club was dissolved due to the economic limitations.
