= Mejorada FS =

Spanish futsal club

Mejorada
- Full name: Club Deportivo Algon; Fútbol Sala/ Mejorada Fútbol Sala
- Nickname(s): --
- Founded: 1983
- Dissolved: 1996
- Ground: Pabellón Municipal, Mejorada del Campo, Community of Madrid, Spain
- Capacity: 1,000
- Chairman: (Spain) Alberto Martín
- Manager: league =
- 1995–96: División de Honor, 17th
Home colours	Away colours

Mejorada Fútbol Sala was a futsal club based in Mejorada del Campo, Community of Madrid. The club also was known as Algon FS.

== History ==
- Mejorada Fútbol Sala was founded in 1983 as Club Deportivo Algon Fútbol Sala. In 1992, the club was moved from Arganda de Rey to Mejorada del Campo. In 1996, the club was dissolved due large debts.

== Season to season ==
Season	Division	Place	Copa de España
1989/90	D. Honor	3rd	
1990/91	D. Honor	3rd	
1991/92	D. Honor	6th	
1992/93	D. Honor	7th	
1993/94	D. Honor	4th	
1994/95	D. Honor	6th	
1995/96	D. Honor	17th	

- 7 seasons in División de Honor

== Trophies ==
- División de Honor: 0
  - Semifinals: 1990–91, 1994–95
- Copa de España: 0
  - Semifinals: 1993–94

== Famous players ==
- (Brazil) (Spain) Daniel Ibañes
- (Spain) Javier Lozano
