= Maspalomas FS =

Maspalomas Sol de Europa
- Full name: Maspalomas Fútbol Sala/ Disoft Club de Fútbol Sala
- Founded: 1985
- Dissolved: 2004
- Ground: Juan Beltrán Sierra, Las Palmas, Canary Islands, Spain
- Capacity: 2,000
- Chairman: (Spain) José Gabriel
- Manager: (Spain) Roberto Llamas
- League: División de Plata
- 2003–04: División de Plata, 4th
Home colours	Away colours

Maspalomas Fútbol Sala was a futsal club based in Las Palmas, Canary Islands. Better known as Maspalomas Sol Europa, it became one of the most important futsal clubs from Spain.

The club was also known as Maspalomas Palm Oasis in 1995–96 season.

== History ==
- Maspalomas Fútbol Sala was founded in 1985. One of first sponsors was Muebles El Norte. They were a habitual team in RFEF futsal league. After the unification of futsal leagues, they were chosen to compete in new División de Honor. In 1993–94 season, Maspalomas Sol Europa won the national championship. In 1996–97 season, Maspalomas Sol Europa qualified for play-offs for the title, but were eliminated in Semifinals. In 1998–99, the team were relegated to División de Plata. However, shortly before to start 1999–2000 season, Maspalomas FS merged with Disoft CFS. In the past several seasons, the team played in División de Plata as Disoft Las Palmas. 2003–04 season was the last for Maspalomas FS, the club was dissolved due to large debts.

== Season to season ==
Season	Division	Place	Copa de España
1989/90	D. Honor	4th	
1990/91	D. Honor	12th	
1991/92	1ª Nacional A	1st	
1992/93	D. Honor	4th	
1993/94	D. Honor	2nd	
1994/95	D. Honor	7th	
1995/96	D. Honor	14th	
1996/97	D. Honor	3rd	Winners

Season	Division	Place	Copa de España
1997/98	D. Honor	11th	
1998/99	D. Honor	18th	
1999/00	D. Plata	4th	
2000/01	D. Plata	6th	
2001/02	D. Plata	8th	
2002/03	D. Plata	4th	
2003/04	D. Plata	4th	

- 9 seasons in División de Honor
- 5 seasons in División de Plata
- 1 season in 1ª Nacional A

== Trophies ==
- División de Honor: 1
  - Winners: 1993–94
- Copa de España: 1
  - Winners: 1996–97
- Supercopa de España: 0
  - Runners-Up: 1994–95, 1997–98
- European Championship: 0
  - Runners-Up: 1994–95
