= Caja Segovia FS =

Spanish futsal club

Caja Segovia
- Full name: Caja Segovia Fútbol Sala
- Founded: 1985
- Dissolved: 2013
- Ground: Pedro Delgado, Segovia, Castile and León, Spain
- Capacity: 2,800
- 2013–14: Segunda División, 10th
Home colours	Away colours

Caja Segovia Fútbol Sala, was a futsal club based in Segovia, city of the Province of Segovia in the autonomous community of Castile and León.

The club was founded in 1985 and held its home matches in Pedro Delgado with capacity of 2,800 seaters.

== History ==
In July 2013, after 24 seasons in top league of Spanish futsal, and after failing to pay the enrolment fee to play in Primera División 2013–14, were relegated to Segunda División changing its official name to CD La Escuela.

In August 2013, the club was disbanded due to large debts and a new club was created taking the Caja Segovia spot in Segunda División.

== Season to season ==
Season	Tier	Division	Place	Notes
1989/90	1	D. Honor	3rd	
1990/91	1	D. Honor	4th	
1991/92	1	D. Honor	3rd	
1992/93	1	D. Honor	3rd	
1993/94	1	D. Honor	7th	
1994/95	1	D. Honor	4th	
1995/96	1	D. Honor	8th	
1996/97	1	D. Honor	9th	
1997/98	1	D. Honor	1st	
1998/99	1	D. Honor	3rd	
1999/00	1	D. Honor	2nd	
2000/01	1	D. Honor	6th	

Season	Tier	Division	Place	Notes
2001/02	1	D. Honor	7th	
2002/03	1	D. Honor	7th	
2003/04	1	D. Honor	9th	
2004/05	1	D. Honor	12th	
2005/06	1	D. Honor	9th	
2006/07	1	D. Honor	6th	
2007/08	1	D. Honor	9th	
2008/09	1	D. Honor	7th	
2009/10	1	D. Honor	3rd	
2010/11	1	D. Honor	6th	
2011/12	1	1ª División	4th / SF	
2012/13	1	1ª División	4th / SF	

- 24 seasons in Primera División

== Trophies ==
- División de Honor: 1
  - Winners: 1998–99
- Futsal European Clubs Championship: 1
  - Winners: 1999–2000
- Intercontinental Futsal Cup: 1
  - Winners: 2000
- Copa de España: 3
  - Winners: 1998, 1999, 2000
- Supercopa de España: 3
  - Winners: 1998, 1999, 2000

== Notable former players ==
- (Equatorial Guinea) Roberto Tobe
- (Spain) Lin
- (Spain) Sergio Lozano
- (Spain) Álvaro Aparicio

Category:Caja Segovia FS players
