= Valencia FS =

Spanish futsal club

Valencia ElPozo
- Full name: Valencia ElPozo Fútbol Sala
- Founded: 1983
- Ground: San Isidro, Valencia, Valencian Community, Spain
- Capacity: 500
- Chairman: (Spain) Iván Martí
- Manager: (Spain) Pepe Matoses
- League: 3ª División – Group 14
- 2014–15: 3ª División – Group 14, 13th
| Home colours | Away colours |

Valencia ElPozo Fútbol Sala is a futsal club based in Valencia, city of the province of Valencia in the autonomous community of Valencian Community.

The club was founded in 1983 and her arena is Pabellón San Isidro with capacity of 500 seaters.

- The team was known between 1991 and 2004 as Valencia Vijusa.
- Note: - The team was forced to be relegated to Division de Plata, after of that the principal sponsor, Promociones Armiñana, leave the club.

== Trophies ==
- División de Honor: 0
  - Runners-up: 2000–01
- Supercopa de España: 0
  - Runners-up: 2002–03
- Copa de España (ACEFS): 2
  - Winners: 1982–83, 1983–84
- Copa de España (LNFS): 1
  - Winners: 2001–02
  - Quarterfinals: 2000–01

== Season to season ==
| Season | Tier | Division | Place | Notes |
|---|---|---|---|---|
| 1989/90 | 2 | 1ª Nacional A | 5th | |
| 1990/91 | 2 | 1ª Nacional A | 6th | |
| 1991/92 | 2 | 1ª Nacional A | 6th | |
| 1992/93 | 2 | 1ª Nacional A | 2nd | |
| 1993/94 | 2 | D. Plata | 1st | |
| 1994/95 | 1 | D. Honor | 6th | |
| 1995/96 | 1 | D. Honor | 12th | |
| 1996/97 | 1 | D. Honor | 12th | |
| 1997/98 | 1 | D. Honor | 8th | |
| 1998/99 | 1 | D. Honor | 16th | |
| 1999/00 | 2 | D. Plata | 1st | |
| 2000/01 | 1 | D. Honor | 2nd | |
| 2001/02 | 1 | D. Honor | 6th | |
| 2002/03 | 1 | D. Honor | 8th | |

| Season | Tier | Division | Place | Notes |
|---|---|---|---|---|
| 2003/04 | 1 | D. Honor | 16th | |
| 2004/05 | 2 | D. Plata | 4th | |
| 2005/06 | 2 | D. Plata | 1st | |
| 2006/07 | 2 | D. Plata | 3rd | |
| 2007/08 | 1 | D. Honor | 10th | |
| 2008/09 | 4 | 1ª Provincial | 1st | |
| 2009/10 | 3 | 1ª Nacional A | 4th | |
| 2010/11 | 3 | 1ª Nacional A | 15th | |
| 2011/12 | 4 | 3ª División | 4th | |
| 2012/13 | 4 | 3ª División | 10th | |
| 2013/14 | 4 | 3ª División | 9th | |
| 2014/15 | 4 | 3ª División | 13th | |
| 2015/16 | 4 | 3ª División | — | |

- 10 seasons in División de Honor
- 5 seasons in División de Plata
- 7 seasons in Segunda División B
- 3 seasons in Tercera División

== Notable former players ==
- (Brazil) Leandro Simi
- (Spain) Kike Bonet
- (Spain) Rafa
