= CFS Bilbao =

Spanish futsal club

Tecuni Bilbo
- Full name: Club de Fútbol Sala Bilbao
- Nickname: --
- Founded: 1984
- Ground: La Casilla, Bilbao; Spain
- Capacity: 5,200
- Chairman: Imanol Armentia
- Manager: Jose Andrés Múñoz
- League: 3ª División – Group 6
- 2014–15: 3ª División – Group 6, 3rd
Home colours	Away colours

Club de Fútbol Sala Bilbao is a futsal club based in Bilbao, city of the province of Vizcay in the autonomous community of Basque Country.

The club was founded in 1984 and her home arena is La Casilla with capacity of 5,200 seaters.

Its main sponsor is Tecuni.

== Season to season ==
Season	Tier	Division	Place	Notes
1989/90	2	1ª Nacional A	6th	
1990/91	3	1ª Nacional B	—	
1991/92	2	1ª Nacional A	12th	
1992/93	2	1ª Nacional A	7th	
1993/94	2	D. Plata	6th	
1994/95	2	D. Plata	13th	
1995/96	2	D. Plata	4th	
1996/97	2	D. Plata	13th	
1997/98	2	D. Plata	9th	
1998/99	2	D. Plata	9th	
1999/00	2	D. Plata	11th	
2000/01	2	D. Plata	9th	
2001/02	2	D. Plata	11th	
2002/03	2	D. Plata	8th	

Season	Tier	Division	Place	Notes
2003/04	2	D. Plata	3rd	
2004/05	2	D. Plata	2nd	
2005/06	1	D. Honor	15th	
2006/07	2	D. Plata	1st	
2007/08	2	D. Plata	3rd	
2008/09	2	D. Plata	9th	
2009/10	3	1ª Nacional A	15th	
2010/11	4	1ª Nacional B	3rd	
2010/11	4	3ª División	4th	
2011/12	4	3ª División	4th	
2012/13	4	3ª División	4th	
2013/14	4	3ª División	2nd	
2014/15	4	3ª División	3rd	
2015/16	4	3ª División	—	

- 1 season in Primera División
- 15 seasons in Segunda División
- 4 seasons in Segunda División B
- 6 season in Tercera División
