= Marsanz FS =

Spanish futsal club

Marsanz Torrejón
- Full name: Club Marsanz Fútbol Sala
- Founded: 1980
- Dissolved: 1996
- Ground: Joaquín Blume, Torrejón de Ardoz, Community of Madrid, Spain
- Capacity: 4,000
- Chairman: (Spain) Ramón Sanz
- Manager: (Spain) Julián Herrero
- League: División de Plata
- 1995–96: División de Plata, 2nd
Home colours	Away colours

Club Marsanz Fútbol Sala was a futsal club based in Torrejón de Ardoz, Community of Madrid. Marsanz Torrejón was one of the most important futsal clubs from Spain.

The club was founded in 1980 and its stadium was the ground Joaquín Blume with capacity of 4,000 seats.

The club was founded by the Marsanz company.

The club was also known as Pennzoil Marsanz from 1991 to 1993 thanks the sponsorship of Pennzoil.

== History ==
The club was founded in 1980. The team played in División de Honor 5 seasons and won 1 championship (1992–93). The Interviú-Marsanz duels always will be remembered. In the 1994–95 season, the team was relegated to División de Plata. Although Marsanz Torrejón achieved the promotion to División de Honor in the 1996–97 season, at begin of season, the chairman decided to dissolve the club due to the economic limitations.

== Season to season ==
Season	Division	Place	Copa de España
1989/90	D. Honor	2nd	
1990/91	D. Honor	1st	
1991/92	D. Honor	4th	Winners
1992/93	D. Honor	2nd	
1993/94	D. Honor	3rd	Winners
1994/95	D. Honor	8th	
1995/96	D. Plata	2nd	

- 6 seasons in División de Honor
- 1 season in División de Plata

== Trophies ==
- División de Honor: 1
  - Winners: 1992–93
  - Runners-Up: 1990–91
- Copa de España: 2
  - Winners: 1991–92, 1993–94
  - Runners-Up: 1990–91
- Supercopa de España: 2
  - Winners: 1992–93, 1994–95
  - Runners-Up: 1993–94
- European Championship: 1
  - Winners: 1994
