= Javi Eseverri =

Spanish futsal player

Personal information
- Full name: Javier Eseverri Barace
- Date of birth: 28 August 1977 (age 49)
- Place of birth: Pamplona, Spain
- Position: Defender

Team information
- Current team: MRA Navarra

Senior career*
Years	Team	Apps	(Gls)
1995–96	MRA Navarra B		
1996–	MRA Navarra	358	(235)

International career
¿?–	Spain	56	
- * Club domestic league appearances and goals

Javier Eseverri Barace (born 28 August 1977), commonly known as Javi Eseverri, is a Spanish futsal player who plays for MRA Navarra as a Defender.

== Honours ==
- 1 UEFA Championship (2007)
- 1 runner FIFA World Cup(2008)
- 1 División de Plata league (97/98)
- 1 División de Plata Cup (97/98)
- 1 best Ala-Cierre of LNFS (05/06)
