= Leis 26 Pontevedra FS =

Spanish futsal club

Leis Pontevedra
- Full name: Leis 26 Pontevedra; Fútbol Sala
- Founded: 1980
- Ground: Pavillón Municipal, Pontevedra, Galicia, Spain
- Capacity: 4,500
- Chairman: (Spain) José Esperón
- Manager: (Spain) Raul Jiménez
- League: 2ªB División – Group 1
- 2014–15: 2ªB División – Group 1, 11th
Home colours	Away colours

Leis 26 Pontevedra Fútbol Sala is a futsal club based in Pontevedra, city of the province of Pontevedra in the autonomous community of Galicia.

The club was founded in 1980 and their arena is Pavillón Municipal with capacity of 4,500.

The club has the sponsorship of Pescamar and Diario de Pontevedra.

== Season to season ==
Season	Tier	Division	Place	Notes
1992/93	2	1ª Nacional A	8th	
1993/94	3	1ª Nacional A	–	
1994/95	3	1ª Nacional A	–	
1995/96	3	1ª Nacional A	–	
1996/97	3	1ª Nacional A	–	
1997/98	3	1ª Nacional A	–	
1998/99	3	1ª Nacional A	–	
1999/00	3	1ª Nacional A	–	
2000/01	3	1ª Nacional A	–	
2001/02	3	1ª Nacional A	–	
2002/03	2	D. Plata	10th	
2003/04	2	D. Plata	5th	

Season	Tier	Division	Place	Notes
2004/05	2	D. Plata	4th	
2005/06	2	D. Plata	7th	
2006/07	2	D. Plata	2nd	
2007/08	1	D. Honor	16th	
2008/09	3	1ª Nacional A	11th	
2009/10	3	1ª Nacional A	13th	
2010/11	3	1ª Nacional A	14th	
2011/12	4	3ª División	6th	
2012/13	4	3ª División	10th	
2013/14	4	3ª División	1st	Promoted
2014/15	3	2ª División B	11th	
2015/16	3	2ª División B	—	

- 1 season in Primera División
- 5 seasons in Segunda División
- 14 seasons in Segunda División B
- 2 season in Tercera División
