= Supercopa de España de Futsal =

The Supercopa de España is a Spanish futsal championship contested by the winners of the División de Honor and the Copa de España.

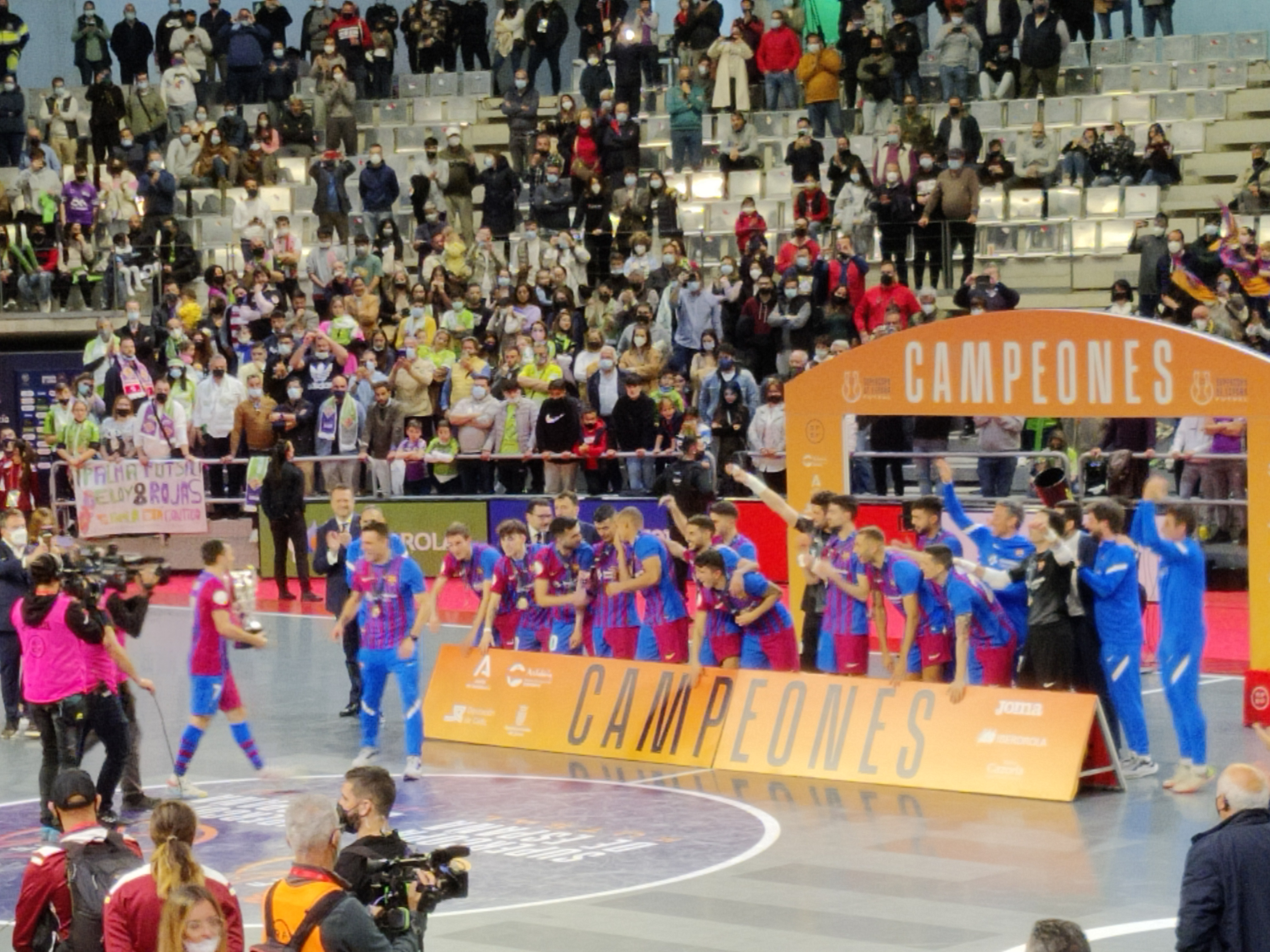
2022 trophy

== Winners ==
Year	Venue	Champion	Runners-up	Score
1990	Not held	Interviú Lloyd's (Note: League and Cup Champion)		
1991	Two legs	Interviú Lloyd's	Caja Toledo	5–3/4–3
1992	Two legs	Pennzoil Marsanz	Caja Toledo	4–1/9–6
1993	Two legs	Macoi Zaragoza	Marsanz Torrejón	6–3/5–5
1994	Two legs	Torrejón Marsanz	Maspalomas Sol Europa	6–3/9–8
1995	Two legs	ElPozo Murcia	Pinturas Lepanto Zaragoza	7–3/4–1
1996	Not held	Boomerang Interviú		
1997	Segovia	CLM Talavera	Maspalomas Costa Canaria	4–3
1998	Murcia	Caja Segovia	ElPozo Murcia	4–3
1999	Not held	Caja Segovia		
2000	Vigo	Caja Segovia	Playas de Castellón	6–5
2001	Ponferrada	Antena3 Boomerang	Playas de Castellón	4–3
2002	Torrejón de Ardoz	Boomerang Interviú	Vijusa Valencia	5–1
2003	Torrejón de Ardoz	Boomerang Interviú	ElPozo Murcia Turística	8–4
2004	Seville	Playas de Castellón	Boomerang Interviú	2–1
2005	A Coruña	Boomerang Interviú	Azkar Lugo	3–0
2006	Castellón	ElPozo Murcia Turística	A. Lobelle	3–2
2007	Benicarló	Interviú Fadesa	ElPozo Murcia Turística	6–4
2008	Segovia	Inter Movistar	Caja Segovia	4–3
2009	Vigo	ElPozo Murcia Turística	Xacobeo 2010 Lobelle	3–2
2010	Guadalajara	Xacobeo 2010 Lobelle	Inter Movistar	3–2
2011	Torrejón de Ardoz	Inter Movistar	FC Barcelona Alusport	4–3
2012	A Coruña	ElPozo Murcia	Inter Movistar	2–2^{(5–4p)}
2013	Two-legs	FC Barcelona Alusport	ElPozo Murcia	1–0/5–5
2014	Two-legs	ElPozo Murcia	Inter Movistar	3–3/5–3
2015	Ciudad Real	Movistar Inter	Jaén Paraíso Interior	6–2
2016	Antequera	ElPozo Murcia	Inter Movistar	3–1
2017	Two-legs	Movistar Inter	ElPozo Murcia	5–2/5–2
2018	Ciudad Real	Movistar Inter	Jaén Paraíso Interior	2–2^{(4–3p)}
2019	Guadalajara	FC Barcelona	ElPozo Murcia	4–3
2020	Madrid	Movistar Inter	FC Barcelona	6–4
2022	Jerez de la Frontera	FC Barcelona	Palma Futsal	2–2^{(3–2p)}
2023	Alzira	FC Barcelona	Movistar Inter	5–3
2024	Jaén	Jimbee Cartagena	FC Barcelona	2–1
2025	Cartagena	Jimbee Cartagena	Real Betis	3–1
2026	Palma de Mallorca	Jimbee Cartagena	Palma Futsal	5–2
2026-II	Barcelona	ElPozo Murcia	FC Barcelona	5–4

== Wins by club ==
Team	Titles	Runner-up	Champion Years
Movistar Inter	14	6	1990, 1991, 1996, 2001, 2002, 2003, 2005, 2007, 2008, 2011, 2015, 2017, 2018, 2020
ElPozo Murcia	7	6	1995, 2006, 2009, 2012, 2014, 2016, 2026-II
FC Barcelona	4	4	2013, 2019, 2022, 2023
Caja Segovia	3	1	1998, 1999, 2000
Jimbee Cartagena	3	0	2024, 2025, 2026
Marsanz Torrejón	2	1	1992, 1994
CLM Talavera	1	2	1997
Playas de Castellón	1	2	2004
Lobelle de Santiago	1	2	2010
P.Lepanto Zaragoza	1	1	1993
Jaén Paraíso Interior	0	2	
Maspalomas Sol Europa	0	2	
Palma Futsal	0	2	
Valencia FS	0	1	
Azkar Lugo	0	1	
Real Betis	0	1	
