= O Parrulo FS =

Spanish futsal club

Cofersa O Parrulo
- Full name: O Parrulo Fútbol Sala
- Nickname: --
- Founded: 1981
- Ground: Pavillón A Malata, Ferrol, Galicia, Spain
- Capacity: 4,200
- Chairman: (Spain) Julio Martínez
- Manager: (Spain) Hector Souto
- League: 1ª División
- 2018–19: 13th
Home colours	Away colours

O Parrulo Fútbol Sala is a futsal club based in Ferrol, Spain. Its pavilion is Pavillón A Malata with a capacity of 6,000 seats. Their main sponsor is Estrella Galicia. The team played 5 seasons in División de Honor. (from 1998/99 to 2002/03).

== Season to season ==
Season	Tier	Division	Place	Notes
1989/90	2	1ª Nacional A	7th	↓
1990/91	3	1ª Nacional B	6th	
1991/92	3	1ª Nacional B	4th	
1992/93	3	1ª Nacional B	3rd	↑
1993/94	3	1ª Nacional A	6th	
1994/95	3	1ª Nacional A	—	
1995/96	3	1ª Nacional A	1st	↑
1996/97	2	D. Plata	3rd	
1997/98	2	D. Plata	1st	↑
1998/99	1	D. Honor	13th	
1999/00	1	D. Honor	6th	
2000/01	1	D. Honor	12th	
2001/02	1	D. Honor	14th	
2002/03	1	D. Honor	16th	↓
2003/04	2	D. Plata	11th	
2004/05	2	D. Plata	13th	

Season	Tier	Division	Place	Notes
2005/06	2	D. Plata	14th	↓
2006/07	3	1ª Nacional A	6th	
2007/08	3	1ª Nacional A	4th	
2008/09	3	1ª Nacional A	3rd	
2009/10	3	1ª Nacional A	1st	
2010/11	3	1ª Nacional A	3rd	
2011/12	3	2ª División B	2nd	
2012/13	3	2ª División B	2nd	↑
2013/14	2	2ª División	13th	
2014/15	2	2ª División	11th	
2015/16	2	2ª División	9th	
2016/17	2	2ª División	7th	↑
2017/18	1	1ª División	14th	
2018/19	1	1ª División	13th	
2019/20	1	1ª División		

- 8 seasons in Primera División
- 9 seasons in Segunda División
- 11 seasons in Segunda División B
- 3 seasons in Tercera División

== Current squad ==
#	Position	Name	Nationality
1	Goalkeeper	Illi González	(Spain)
5	Winger	Iván Rumbo	(Spain)
7	Winger	Iago Rodríguez	(Spain)
9	Defender	Isma Samartino	(Spain)
10	Winger	Adri Martínez	(Spain)
11	Pivot	Saura	(Spain)
12	Winger	Rahali	(Morocco)
14	Winger	Miguel Muñoz	(Spain)
15	Defender	Manabu Takita	(Japan)
16	Winger	Miguel Caeiro	(Spain)
17	Winger	Raúl López	(Spain)
18	Winger	Costi	(Spain)
20	Pivot	Kaoru Morioka	(Japan)
21	Defender	Diego Núñez	(Spain)
22	Goalkeeper	Chemi Oliver	(Spain)
25	Winger-Pivot	Kevin Chis	(Spain)
30	Winger-Defender	Hélder	(Spain)
