= Castilla-La Mancha FS =

Spanish futsal club

- Full name: Castilla-La Mancha Fútbol Sala
- Founded: 1984
- Dissolved: 2000
- Ground: 1º de Mayo, Talavera de la Reina, Castile-La Mancha, Spain
- Capacity: 3,000
- Chairman: (Spain) Vicente Nieto
- Manager: (Spain) Faustino Pérez
- 1999–00: División de Honor, 3rd
Home colours	Away colours

Castilla-La Mancha Fútbol Sala was a futsal club based in Talavera de la Reina, Castile-La Mancha. Castilla-La Mancha was one of the most important futsal clubs from Spain.

The club was founded in 1984 and its stadium was the ground 1º de Mayo with a capacity of 3,000 seats.

The club was sponsored by Caja Toledo from 1990–91 until 1991–92 and by Caja Castilla-La Mancha, from 1992–93 until 1994–95. During the season of 1995–96 the team was known as Toledart.

== History ==
The club was founded in 1984. The club reached the División de Honor in 1989–90 season. From 1990–91 season until 1999–00 season the club played in División de Honor continuously. At the end of season 1999–00, the owner of the club sold his seat to Azkar Lugo FS.

== Season to season ==
Season	Division	Place	Copa de España
1989/90	1ª Nacional A	1st	
1990/91	D. Honor	2nd	Winners
1991/92	D. Honor	4th	
1992/93	D. Honor	1st	
1993/94	D. Honor	1st	
1994/95	D. Honor	1st	

Season	Division	Place	Copa de España
1995/96	D. Honor	5th	
1996/97	D. Honor	2nd	
1997/98	D. Honor	4th	
1998/99	D. Honor	2nd	
1999/00	D. Honor	3rd	

- 10 seasons in División de Honor
- 1 season in 1ª Nacional A

== Trophies ==
- División de Honor: 2
  - Winners: 1991–92 and 1996–97
- Copa de España: 1
  - Winners: 1990–91
- Supercopa de España: 1
  - Winners: 1996–97
- Iberian Futsal Cup: 1
  - Winners: 1992–93

=== International competitions ===
- Futsal European Clubs Championship winners (1): 1998
