= FS García =

Spanish futsal club

Industrias Santa Coloma
- Full name: Fútbol Sala García
- Founded: 1975
- Ground: Pavelló Nou, Santa Coloma de Gramenet; Spain
- Capacity: 2,200
- Chairman: (Spain) Vicenç García
- Coach: (Spain) Xavi Closas
- League: Primera División
- 2022–23: Regular season: 9th of 16; Playoffs: DNQ
- Website: https://fsgarcia.cat/
Home colours	Away colours

Fútbol Sala García is a futsal club based in Santa Coloma de Gramenet, city of the province of Barcelona in the autonomous community of Catalonia.

The club was founded in 1975 and her pavilion is Pavelló Nou with capacity of 2,200 seaters.

The club's main sponsor is Catgas Energia.

== History ==
Marfil Santa Coloma was founded in 1975 as Fútbol Sala Indústrias García. In 1999, they reach the finals of División of Honor. In 2001, the club was very close to be wound up. But in 2001, a local entrepreneur, Alfonso García, owner of Marfil Alella wineries, bought the club, and renamed him as Fútbol Sala Marfil Santa Coloma.

During 2001–2015 period, the club was named FS Marfil Santa Coloma, but in summer 2015 changed its official naming to FS García.

=== Club names ===
- FS Industrias García - (1975–2001)
- FS Marfil Santa Coloma - (2001–2015)
- FS García - (2015– present)

== Season to season ==
Season	Tier	Division	Place	Notes
1989/90	1	D. Honor	6th	
1990/91	1	D. Honor	9th	
1991/92	1	D. Honor	8th	
1992/93	1	D. Honor	1st	
1993/94	1	D. Honor	11th	
1994/95	1	D. Honor	3rd	
1995/96	1	D. Honor	9th	
1996/97	1	D. Honor	5th	
1997/98	1	D. Honor	7th	
1998/99	1	D. Honor	5th	
1999/00	1	D. Honor	11th	
2000/01	1	D. Honor	8th	
2001/02	1	D. Honor	10th	
2002/03	1	D. Honor	12th	

Season	Tier	Division	Place	Notes
2003/04	1	D. Honor	8th	
2004/05	1	D. Honor	16th	↓
2005/06	2	D. Plata	3rd	
2006/07	2	D. Plata	4th	
2007/08	2	D. Plata	4th	↑
2008/09	1	D. Honor	14th	
2009/10	1	D. Honor	6th	
2010/11	1	D. Honor	14th	
2011/12	1	1ª División	14th	
2012/13	1	1ª División	9th	
2013/14	1	1ª División	4th / SF	
2014/15	1	1ª División	12th	
2015/16	1	1ª División	7th	
2016/17	1	1ª División	—	

- 25 seasons in Primera División
- 3 seasons in Segunda División

== Current squad ==
As of 23 November 2024

Note: Flags indicate national team as defined under FIFA eligibility rules; some limited exceptions apply. Players may hold more than one non-FIFA nationality.

No.	Pos.	Nation	Player
1	Goalkeeper	ESP	Borja Puerta
2	Winger	ESP	Bernat Povill
3	Defender	ESP	Marc Tolrà
4	Defender	ESP	Uri Santos
7	Winger	ESP	Marc Puigvert
9	Pivot	ITA	Matías Leguizamón
10	Winger	ESP	Víctor Ramos
11	Pivot	BRA	Leandrinho
12	Winger	ESP	Albert Cardona
15	Goalkeeper	ESP	Àlex Lluch
17	Defender	ARG	Sebastián Corso (captain)
20	Winger	ESP	Nil Closas
21	Winger	ESP	Álex Verdejo
23	Defender	ESP	Niel·lo Bertrán
24	Winger	ESP	Victor Pérez
27	Winger	ESP	Joan Vázquez

== Notable players ==
- (Spain) Óscar Redondo
