= AD Super Sego FS =

Spanish futsal club

Pinturas Lepanto
- Full name: Agrupación Deportiva Super Sego Fútbol Sala
- Founded: 1983
- Dissolved: 1998
- Ground: Príncipe Felipe, Zaragoza, Aragon, Spain
- Capacity: 12,000
- Chairman: (Spain) Julián Corredera
- Manager: (Spain) Luis Ángel Corredera
- 1997–98: División de Honor, 18th
Home colours	Away colours

Agrupación Deportiva Super Sego Fútbol Sala was a futsal club based in Zaragoza, Aragon. It was better known as Pinturas Lepanto or Sego Zaragoza.

The team played on pavilion Príncipe Felipe with capacity of 12,000 seats.

Seasons 1993–94 and 1994–95, the team was sponsored by Pinturas Lepanto.

== History ==
- The club was founded in 1983. At end of season 1996–97, the problems begin, with the unpaid wages to the players. At 1997–98 mid-season, the club was disqualified due a non-appearance in two matches. The reasons were again, the non-payment of wages to her players. After Sego Zaragoza disappearance, Sala 10 Zaragoza became the most representative futsal club in Aragon.

== Season to season ==
Season	Division	Place	Copa de España
1989/90	1ª Nacional A	1st	
1990/91	1ª Nacional A	1st	
1991/92	D. Honor	6th	
1992/93	D. Honor	2nd	
1993/94	D. Honor	6th	

Season	Division	Place	Copa de España
1994/95	D. Honor	2nd	
1995/96	D. Honor	4th	
1996/97	D. Honor	13th	
1997/98	D. Honor	Disq.	

- 6 seasons in División de Honor
- 2 season in 1ª Nacional A

== Honours ==
- División de Honor: 1
  - Winners: 1994–95
  - Semifinals: 1991–92, 1992–93, 1993–94
  - Quarter-finals: 1995–96
- Copa de España: 1
  - Winners: 1992–93
  - Runners-Up: 1991–92
  - Semifinals: 1994–95
- Supercopa de España: 1
  - Winners: 1993–94
  - Runners-Up: 1995–96
