= Futsal in Spain =

The Spanish futsal league is divided into divisions. The top teams play in the División de Honor (also called Liga Nacional de Fútbol Sala). In each division, a team plays all other teams twice, once at home and once away.

The Spanish league teams compete in Europe under UEFA, most notably in the UEFA Futsal Cup with great success, being the national league holding more continental titles. The teams also compete in a domestic cup competition each year, called the Copa del Rey. The winner of the División de Honor plays against the winner of the Copa del Rey in the Supercopa de España (Super Cup).

== Current hierarchical divisional breakdowns ==
As of 6 September 2017

- Primera División de Futsal (16 teams)
- Segunda División de Futsal (16 teams)
- Segunda División B de Futsal (103 teams in 6 groups)
- Tercera División de Futsal (264 teams in 19 groups)
- List of futsal clubs in Spain

For a list of teams, see List of futsal clubs in Spain

The Spain national futsal team represents the whole country, and has twice won the World Championship and six times the UEFA Futsal Championship, which makes Spain the second international futsal power, after Brazil.

== Current female hierarchical divisional breakdowns ==
- Division de Honor (16 teams)
- List of futsal clubs in Spain

For a list of teams, see List of futsal clubs in Spain

The Spain women's national futsal team represents the whole country.

== Other competitions ==
- Copa de España de Futsal
- Supercopa de España de Futsal
