= Segunda División B de Futsal =

Segunda División B
- Founded: 1989
- Country: Spain
- Confederation: UEFA
- Number of clubs: 6 groups of 14, 15 or 16 team each one.
- Level on pyramid: 3
- Promotion to: Segunda División
- Relegation to: Tercera División
- Domestic cup: Copa del Rey
- International cup: None
- Website: rfef.es

The Segunda División B de Futsal formerly known as Primera Nacional A is the third professional futsal pyramid in Spain. It was founded in 1989 and is managed by the CNFS of the Royal Spanish Football Federation.

The Segunda División B de Futsal consists in 9 groups. Every group corresponds to one or two Spanish regions. There are in total 147 approx. teams. When finishing the regular season in every group, the top team of each group and the four runners-up with highest scores play the promotion playoffs to Segunda División. Conversely, the two or three bottom teams of each group are relegated to Tercera División.

By winning the promotion via playoffs doesn't necessarily mean the promotion for the winning team. Some teams are forced to give up for not meet financial requirements to play in LNFS, even having won the promotion.

- From 2011–12' season onwards, Primera Nacional A will be known as Segunda División B.

== 2015–16 groups and teams ==
- In **Bold**, 2014–15 group winners and qualified teams for promotion playoffs.

=== Group 1 ===
Teams from Galicia, Castile and León and Asturias.

Location of Segunda División B – Group 1 teams 2015–16

| | Club | City/area | Website/link | 2014–15 season |
|---|---|---|---|---|
| 1 | **Mosteiro Bembrive** | Bembrive, Vigo | Mosteiro Bembrive | 1st |
| 2 | Universidad de Valladolid | Valladolid | Universidad de Valladolid | 3rd |
| 3 | Noia | Noia | Noia | 4th |
| 4 | Pizarras 3 Cuñados | O Barco | Pizarras 3 Cuñados | 5th |
| 5 | Deporcyl Guardo | Guardo | Deporcyl Guardo | 6th |
| 6 | Cistierna | Cistierna | Cistierna | 7th |
| 7 | Piensos Durán Albense | Alba de Tormes | Piensos Durán Albense | 8th |
| 8 | Naturpellet Cuéllar | Cuéllar | Naturpellet Cuéllar | 9th |
| 9 | O'Esteo | As Pontes | O'Esteo | 10th |
| 10 | Leis Pontevedra | Pontevedra | Leis Pontevedra | 11th |
| 11 | Husqvarna Ventorrillo | A Coruña | Husqvarna Ventorrillo | 11th |
| 12 | Boal | Boal | Boal | Promoted |
| 13 | Bueu | Bueu | Bueu | Promoted |
| 14 | A Fuga Xove | Xove | A Fuga Xove | Promoted |
| 15 | Sala Ourense Prolsport | Ourense | Sala Ourense Prolsport | Promoted |
| 16 | Atl. Benavente | Benavente | Atl. Benavente | Promoted |

=== Group 2 ===
Teams from Basque Country, Navarre, Aragon, La Rioja & Valencian Community

Location of Segunda División B – Group 2 teams 2015–16

| | Club | City/area | Website/link | 2014–15 season |
|---|---|---|---|---|
| 1 | **Colo-Colo** | Zaragoza | Colo-Colo | 1st |
| 2 | Zierbena | Zierbena | Zierbena | 2nd |
| 3 | Pinseque | Pinseque | Pinseque | 3rd |
| 4 | Concepto Egile | Elgoibar–Eibar | Concepto Egile | 4th |
| 5 | Unizar Ebrosala | Zaragoza | Unizar Ebrosala | 5th |
| 6 | Gurpea Xota B | Irurtzun | Gurpea Xota B | 6th |
| 7 | San Juan | Pamplona | San Juan | 7th |
| 8 | Sala Quinto | Quinto | Sala Quinto | 8th |
| 9 | Lauburu Ibarra | Ibarra | Lauburu Ibarra | 9th |
| 10 | Fuenmayor | Fuenmayor | Fuenmayor | 10th |
| 11 | Viveros Mas de Valero | Segorbe | Viveros Mas de Valero | 11th |
| 12 | Santurtzi | Santurtzi | Santurtzi | 12th |
| 13 | Aurrerá de Vitoria | Vitoria-Gasteiz | Aurrerá de Vitoria | 13th |
| 14 | Labastida Rioja Alavesa | Labastida/Bastida | Labastida Rioja Alavesa | 14th |
| 15 | Sala Cadrete | Cadrete | Sala Cadrete | Promoted |
| 16 | Embalajes Blanco Murillo | Murillo de Río Leza | Embalajes Blanco Murillo | Promoted |

=== Group 3 ===
Teams from Catalonia, Valencian Community and Balearic Islands.

Location of Segunda División B – Group 3 teams 2015–16 (Barcelona province teams)
Location of remaining teams

| | club | city | link | 2014–15 season |
|---|---|---|---|---|
| 1 | **Escola Pia** | Sabadell | Escola Pia | 1st |
| 2 | Pallejà | Pallejà | Pallejà | 2nd |
| 3 | Riera Cornellà | Cornellà de Llobregat | Riera Cornellà | 3rd |
| 4 | Catgas Energia B | Santa Coloma de Gramenet | Catgas Energia B | 4th |
| 5 | Ripollet | Ripollet | Ripollet | 5th |
| 6 | Manresa | Manresa | Manresa | 7th |
| 7 | Olimpyc Floresta | La Floresta | Olimpyc Floresta | 8th |
| 8 | Salou | Salou | Salou | 9th |
| 9 | La Unión | Santa Coloma de Gramenet | La Unión | 10th |
| 10 | Montcada | Montcada i Reixac | Montcada | 11th |
| 11 | Sala 5 Martorell | Martorell | Sala 5 Martorell | 12th |
| 12 | Bellsport | L'Hospitalet de Llobregat | Bellsport | 13th |
| 13 | Esparreguera | Esparreguera | Esparreguera | 14th |
| 14 | Castelldefels/Gavà | Castelldefels | Castelldefels/Gavà | Promoted |
| 15 | Esplugues | Esplugues de Llobregat | Esplugues | Promoted |
| 16 | Playas CD Castellón | Castellón | Playas CD Castellón | Promoted |
| 17 | Barceloneta | Barcelona | Barceloneta | Promoted |
| 18 | VFS-Peña Deportiva | Santa Eulària des Riu | VFS-Peña Deportiva | Promoted |

=== Group 4 ===
Teams from Community of Madrid, Extremadura, Castile-La Mancha and Valencian Community.

Location of Segunda División B – Group 4 teams 2015–16 (madrilenian teams)
Location of Segunda División B – Group 4 teams 2015–16 (remaining teams)

| | Club | City/area | Website/link | 2014–15 season |
|---|---|---|---|---|
| 1 | **Rivas** | Rivas Vaciamadrid | Rivas | 1st |
| 2 | Soliss Talavera | Talavera de la Reina | Soliss Talavera | 2nd |
| 3 | Silver Novanca | Leganés | Silver Novanca | 3rd |
| 4 | Leganés | Leganés | Leganés | 4th |
| 5 | Tecnoy Gran Peña | Arganzuela, Madrid | Tecnoy Gran Peña | 5th |
| 6 | Movistar Inter B | Alcalá de Henares | Movistar Inter B | 6th |
| 7 | Manzanares Quesos El Hidalgo | Manzanares | Manzanares Quesos El Hidalgo | 8th |
| 8 | San Clemente Isla Paraíso | San Clemente | San Clemente Isla Paraíso | 9th |
| 9 | Torrejón Sala | Torrejón de Ardoz | Torrejón Sala | 10th |
| 10 | Integra2 Navalmoral | Navalmoral de la Mata | Integra2 Navalmoral | 11th |
| 11 | Torres de la Alameda | Torres de la Alameda | Torres de la Alameda | 10th |
| 12 | ADAE Simancas | Madrid | ADAE Simancas | 11th |
| 13 | Xaloc Alacant | Alicante | Xaloc Alacant | 12th |
| 14 | Ciudad de Alcorcón | Alcorcón | Ciudad de Alcorcón | 13th |
| 15 | Dénia | Dénia | Dénia | Promoted |
| 16 | Buhersa Talayuela | Talayuela | Buhersa Talayuela | Promoted |
| 17 | Bargas Soliss | Bargas | Bargas Soliss | Promoted |
| 18 | Pilaristas | Madrid | Pilaristas | Promoted |

=== Group 5 ===
Teams from Andalusia, Ceuta & Melilla.

Location of Segunda División B – Group 5 teams 2015–16

| | Club | City/area | Website/link | 2014–15 season |
|---|---|---|---|---|
| 1 | Atl. Mengíbar | Mengíbar | Mengíbar | 2nd |
| 2 | Mundoseguros Triana | Triana, Seville | Mundoseguros Triana | 3rd |
| 3 | Coineña | Coín | Coineña | 5th |
| 4 | Unión África Ceutí | Ceuta | Unión África Ceutí | 6th |
| 5 | Ategua | Castro del Río | | 10th |
| 6 | B. Calderería Manzano | Bujalance | B. Calderería Manzano | 11th |
| 7 | Victoria Kent | Alhaurín de la Torre | Victoria Kent | 12th |
| 8 | UEx Malpartida | Malpartida de Cáceres | UEx Malpartida | Relocated |
| 9 | Peligros | Peligros | Peligros | Promoted |
| 10 | Isleño | San Fernando | Isleño | Promoted |
| 11 | Sporting Constitución | Melilla | Sporting Constitución | Promoted |
| 12 | Stilo Textil VDR | Villa del Río | Stilo Textil VDR | Promoted |
| 13 | Itea Automatismos | Córdoba | Itea Automatismos | Promoted |

=== Group 6 ===
Teams from Canary Islands.

==== Tenerife subgroup ====
| | Club | City/area | Website/link | 2013–14 season |
|---|---|---|---|---|
| 1 | **Uruguay Tenerife B** | Santa Cruz de Tenerife | Uruguay Tenerife B | 1st |
| 2 | Las Cuevecitas | Las Cuevecitas | Las Cuevecitas | 2nd |
| 3 | Gomera | San Sebastián de La Gomera | Gomera | 3rd |
| 4 | Bohemios | Taco | Bohemios | 4th |
| 5 | Cruz de la Cebolla | La Orotava | Cruz de la Cebolla | 5th |
| 6 | Famegonza | San Cristóbal de La Laguna | Famegonza | 6th |
| 7 | Adeymar Benijos | La Orotava | | 7th |
| 8 | Matanza | La Matanza de Acentejo | Matanza | 8th |
| 9 | Duggi | Santa Cruz de Tenerife | Duggi | 9th |
| 10 | Costa Sur | Cabo Blanco | Costa Sur | 10th |
| 11 | Cosmos II | Icod de los Vinos | | 11th |
| 12 | China | Igueste | China | Promoted |

Location of Segunda División B – Group 6ºA teams 2014–15

==== Las Palmas subgroup ====
| | Club | City/area | Website/link | 2013–14 season |
|---|---|---|---|---|
| 1 | **Malta97 Las Palmas** | Las Palmas de Gran Canaria | Malta97 Las Palmas | 1st |
| 2 | Profiltek Agüimes | Agüimes | Profiltek Agüimes | 2nd |
| 3 | Aguas de Teror | San José del Álamo | Aguas de Teror | 3rd |
| 4 | La Cuevita | Artenara | La Cuevita | 6th |
| 5 | Arguineguín | Arguineguín | Arguineguín | 10th |
| 6 | Mata Tallas Grandes | Vecindario | Mata Tallas Grandes | 12th |
| 7 | Arsenal Villa Santa Brígida | Santa Brígida | Arsenal Villa Santa Brígida | 11th |
| 8 | Tahíche Servivend | Tahíche | Tahíche Servivend | 7th |
| 9 | Isla Larga | Gran Tarajal | | Promoted |
| 10 | Cruce de Arinaga | Cruce de Arinaga | Cruce de Arinaga | Promoted |
| 11 | El Doctoral | El Doctoral | | Promoted |
| 12 | Fataga | Fataga | | Promoted |

Location of Segunda División B – Group 6ºB teams 2014–15

== Teams promoted by season ==
| Year | Teams |
|---|---|
| 2008–09 | Valverde, Extremadura Delta Badajoz, Camping El Escorial, La Muela, Illescas, Gijón El Llano, OPDE Ribera Navarra, Avilés Oquendo, Melilla, Unión África Ceutí, Caravaca Cruz 2010 P. Reina, Space Gasifred Ciutat d'Eivissa, Laguna–Playas de Salou & Ribera Alta Tobarra |
| 2009–10 | Fuconsa Jaén, Azulejos y Pavimentos Brihuega & FC Barcelona B Alusport |
| 2010–11 | Manzanares, L'Hospitalet Bellsport, Sala 5 Martorell & Oxipharma |
| 2011–12 | Levante–Dominicos, Castell de Peñiscola, Montesinos Jumilla & Uruguay–Tenerife |
| 2012–13 | L'Hospitalet Bellsport, O'Parrulo & Azulejos Brihuega |
| 2013–14 | Massey Ferguson & Arcebansa Fisiolife Zamora |
| 2014–15 | Real Betis FSN, Cidade de Narón & Puertollano |

== See also ==
- Segunda División de Futsal
- Primera División de Futsal
