= CFS Bisontes Castellón =

Spanish futsal club

Bisontes Castellón
- Full name: Club de Fútbol Sala Bisontes Castellón
- Founded: 1985
- Ground: Ciutat de Castelló, Castellón, Valencian Community, Spain
- Capacity: 6,000
- Chairman: (Spain) Joaquín Sánchez
- Manager: (Spain) Manolín Collado
- League: 2ª División B – Group 3
- 2014–15: 3ª División – Group 14, 2nd – promoted
Home colours	Away colours

Club de Fútbol Sala Bisontes Castellón is a futsal club based in Castellón, city of the province of Castellón in the Spanish autonomous community of Valencian Community.

Its local pavilion is Ciutat de Castelló with a capacity of 6,000.

== History ==
- The club was founded in 1985 by the employees of the factory Macer. The club have had many names as:
  - Keralite Macer — (1989–90)
  - Macer Almazora — (1990–91)
  - Almazora — (1991–92)
  - Bisontes de Almazora — (1992–93)
  - Bisontes de Castellón — (1993–94)
  - Playas de Castellón — (1994–14)
  - Playas CD Castellón — (2015–16)
  - Bisontes de Castellón — (2016–)

In 2011–12 season finished at 16th position at final standings being consequently relegated. But were reinstated as Segunda División team due to vacant seats in that category.

Logo used from 2011 to 2016

In July 2013, LNFS revoked its Segunda División's licence after failing to pay the enrolment fee, so it was demoted to Tercera División for 2013–14 season.

On 13 May 2016, the club is renamed again as Club de Fútbol Sala Bisontes Castellón.

== Season to season ==
Season	Tier	Division	Place	Copa de España
1989/90	1	D. Honor	1st	
1990/91	1	D. Honor	1st	
1991/92	1	D. Honor	5th	
1992/93	1	D. Honor	4th	
1993/94	1	D. Honor	3rd	
1994/95	1	D. Honor	3rd	
1995/96	1	D. Honor	6th	RUP
1996/97	1	D. Honor	1st	
1997/98	1	D. Honor	5th	
1998/99	1	D. Honor	1st	
1999/00	1	D. Honor	1st	
2000/01	1	D. Honor	1st	RUP
2001/02	1	D. Honor	2nd	
2002/03	1	D. Honor	4th	

Season	Tier	Division	Place	Copa de España
2003/04	1	D. Honor	3rd	RUP
2004/05	1	D. Honor	3rd	
2005/06	1	D. Honor	6th	
2006/07	1	D. Honor	10th	
2007/08	1	D. Honor	8th	
2008/09	1	D. Honor	12th	SF
2009/10	1	D. Honor	11th	
2010/11	1	D. Honor	15th	
2011/12	2	2ª División	16th	
2012/13	2	2ª División	7th	
2013/14	4	3ª División	15th	
2014/15	4	3ª División	2nd	
2015/16	3	2ª División B	4th	
2016/17	3	2ª División B	1st	

- 22 seasons in Primera División
- 2 season in Segunda División

== Club honours ==
- Division de Honor: 2
  - 1999–2000, 2000–01
- UEFA Futsal Cup: 2
  - 2001–2002, 2002–2003
- Futsal European Clubs Championship: 1
  - 2000–2001
- Supercopa de Espana: 1
  - 2004

source: http://arquivo.pt/wayback/20091007004708/http://www.playascastellon.com/

== Current squad ==
As of 12 June 2019

#	Position	Name	Nationality
1	Goalkeeper	Salam Bouyajdad	(Morocco)
2	Winger	Chema Barrera	(Spain)
3	Defender	Genís Tena	(Spain)
8	Winger	Javier Rangel	(Spain)
9	Pivot	Diego Solaz	(Spain)
10	Winger	Héctor Malawy	(Spain)
11	Defender	Juanito Martínez	(Spain)
13	Goalkeeper	Nacho Serra	(Spain)
14	Winger	Pipi Martínez	(Spain)
19	Winger	David Señoret	(Spain)
21	Winger	Alberto Lorca	(Spain)
35	Winger	Tití Koukouss	(Morocco)

== Notable former players ==
- (Brazil) (Spain) Alemão
- (Finland) Henri Alamikkotervo
