= Copa de España de Futsal =

- Founded: 1990
- Region: Spain
- Teams: 8 (total)
- Current champions: Jaén Paraíso Interior (2026)
- Most championships: Inter Movistar (11 titles)
- Broadcaster(s): Teledeporte, RTVE Play, IB3
- 2026 Copa de España

The Copa de España de Futsal is an annual cup competition for Spanish futsal teams. It is organized by the Liga Nacional de Fútbol Sala and was founded in the season 1989–90. It is contested annually between the top eight teams in the league table as calculated at the midway point in season, in a neutral venue in different cities every year.

== Season by season ==
Season	Venue	Champion	Runners-up	Score
2026	Granada	Jaén Paraíso Interior	FC Barcelona	0–0 ^{(4–2 pen.)}
2025	Murcia	Servigroup Peñíscola	Illes Balears Palma	4–3
2024	Cartagena	FC Barcelona	ElPozo Murcia	3–3 ^{(4–2 pen.)}
2023	Granada	Jaén Paraíso Interior	Movistar Inter	3–1
2022	Jaén	FC Barcelona	ElPozo Murcia	2–2 ^{(7–6 pen.)}
2021	Madrid	Movistar Inter	FC Barcelona	6–1
2020	Málaga	FC Barcelona	Viña Albali Valdepeñas	4–3
2019	Valencia	FC Barcelona	ElPozo Murcia	2–1
2018	Madrid	Jaén Paraíso Interior	Movistar Inter	4–3
2017	Ciudad Real	Movistar Inter	ElPozo Murcia	4–4 ^{(9–8 pen.)}
2016	Guadalajara	Movistar Inter	ElPozo Murcia	2–1
2015	Ciudad Real	Jaén Paraíso Interior	FC Barcelona	6–4
2014	Logroño	Inter Movistar	ElPozo Murcia	4–3
2013	Alcalá de Henares	FC Barcelona	ElPozo Murcia	4–2
2012	Logroño	FC Barcelona	Autos Lobelle de Santiago	5–3
2011	Segovia	FC Barcelona	ElPozo Murcia	3–2
2010	Santiago de Compostela	ElPozo Murcia Turística	Xacobeo 2010 Lobelle	3–2
2009	Granada	Inter Movistar	ElPozo Murcia Turística	5–3
2008	Cuenca	ElPozo Murcia Turística	Móstoles 2008	2–1
2007	Lugo	Boomerang Interviú	ElPozo Murcia Turística	8–4
2006	Zaragoza	Autos Lobelle de Santiago	Boomerang Interviú	2–2 ^{(5–4 pen.)}
2005	Pamplona	Boomerang Interviú	Azkar Lugo	4–3
2004	Santiago de Compostela	Boomerang Interviú	Playas de Castellón	3–1
2003	Córdoba	ElPozo Murcia Turística	Interviú Boomerang	5–1
2002	Valencia	Valencia Vijusa	ElPozo Murcia	6–5
2001	Murcia	Antena 3 Boomerang	Playas de Castellón	5–3
2000	Torrejón de Ardoz	Caja Segovia	CLM Talavera	2–1
1999	Roquetas de Mar	Caja Segovia	Boomerang Interviú	3–2
1998	Segovia	Caja Segovia	CLM Talavera	1–0
1997	Murcia	Maspalomas Sol de Europa	Boomerang Interviú	2–1
1996	Castellón de la Plana	Interviú Boomerang	Playas de Castellón	1–1 (3–2 pen.)
1995	Murcia	ElPozo Murcia	Caja Castilla La Mancha	6–3
1994	Castellón de la Plana	Marsanz Torrejón	ElPozo Murcia	2–1
1993	Zaragoza	Sego Zaragoza	Caja Castilla La Mancha	6–4
1992	Cáceres	Marsanz Torrejón	Sego Zaragoza	4–4 (3–2 pen.)
1991	Zaragoza	Caja Toledo	Marsanz Torrejón	6–5
1990	Lanzarote	Interviú Lloyd's	Keralite Macer	6–4

=== Number of titles ===
#	Team	# Titles	Winning years
1	Movistar Inter	11	1990, 1996, 2001, 2004, 2005, 2007, 2009, 2014, 2016, 2017, 2021
2	FC Barcelona	7	2011, 2012, 2013, 2019, 2020, 2022, 2024
3	ElPozo Murcia	4	1995, 2003, 2008, 2010
3	Jaén Paraíso Interior	4	2015, 2018, 2023, 2026
5	Caja Segovia	3	1998, 1999, 2000
6	Marsanz Torrejón	2	1992, 1994
7	CLM Talavera	1	1991
7	Sego Zaragoza	1	1993
7	Maspalomas Sol de Europa	1	1997
7	Valencia Vijusa	1	2002
7	Autos Lobelle de Santiago	1	2006
7	Servigroup Peñíscola	1	2025

== Related competitions ==
- Primera División de Futsal
- Segunda División de Futsal
- Supercopa de España de Futsal
- Copa del Rey de Futsal
