= Segunda División de Futsal =

Segunda División
- Founded: 1993
- Country: Spain
- Confederation: UEFA
- Number of clubs: 16 teams
- Level on pyramid: 2
- Promotion to: Primera División
- Relegation to: Segunda División B
- Domestic cup: Copa del Rey
- International cup: None
- Current champions: AD Sala 10 (2023–24)
- Website: www.lnfs.es
- Current: 2024–25

The Segunda División is the second professional futsal league in Spain. It was founded in 1993 with the name of División de Plata. Administered by Liga Nacional de Fútbol Sala, it is contested by 16 teams and is played under UEFA rules, with the champion team and the winner of a play-off promoted to Primera División and replaced by the two lowest-placed teams in that division.

The Liga Nacional de Futsal includes:

- Primera División — 1st level.
- Segunda División de Futsal — 2nd level.

== Liga championship rules ==
Each team of every division has to play with all the other teams of its division twice, once at home and the other at the opponent's stadium. This means that in Segunda División de Futsal the league ends after every team plays 30 matches.

Like many other leagues in continental Europe, the Segunda División de Futsal takes a winter break once each team has played half its schedule. One unusual feature of the league is that the two halves of the season are played in the same order—that is, the order of each team's first-half fixtures is repeated in the second half of the season, with the only difference being the stadiums used.

Each victory adds 3 points to the team in the league ranking. Each drawn adds 1 point.head-to-head. At the end of the league, the winner is:

1. The team that has most points in the ranking.
2. If two or more teams are level on points, the winner is the team that has the best results
3. If there is no winner after applying the second rule, then the team with the best overall goal difference wins.

== Clubs ==
The following 16 clubs are competing in the 2024–25 season.

Club	Location	Stadium	Capacity
(Galicia (Spain)) ADC Lugo Sala	Lugo	Pabellón Municipal de Deportes Lugo	2,000
(Valencian Community) Alzira FS	Alzira	Palau d'Esports de Alzira	2,800
(Catalonia) Barça Atlètic	Sant Joan Despí	Ciutat Esportiva Joan Gamper	1,000
(Andalusia) CD El Ejido Futsal	El Ejido	Pabellón Municipal de Deportes de El Ejido	2,000
(Community of Madrid) CD Leganés FS	Leganés	Pabellón Deportivo Europa	4,254
(Melilla) CD Melistar FS	Melilla	Pabellón Javier Imbroda	3,800
(Andalusia) Málaga FS	Málaga	Pabellón José Luis Pérez Canca	1,000
(Catalonia) Club Sala 5 Martorell	Martorell	Pabellón Deportivo Municipal	2,000
(Aragon) Colo Colo Zaragoza	Zaragoza	CDM La Granja	1,000
(Valencian Community) Levante UD FS	Valencia	Pabellón Municipal de Paterna	1,600
(Galicia (Spain)) O Parrulo Ferrol	Ferrol	Polideportivo A Malata	4,200
(Andalusia) Real Betis Futsal	Seville	Palacio Municipal de Deportes San Pablo	7,626
(Valencian Community) Sporting FS La Nucía	La Nucía	Pabellón Camilo Cano	1,000
(Balearic Islands) UD Ibiza Gasifred	Ibiza	Poliesportiu Insular Sa Blanca Dona	2,000
(Ceuta) Unión África Ceutí	Ceuta	Polideportivo Guillermo Molina	1,000
(Region of Murcia) Zambú CFS Pinatar	San Pedro del Pinatar	Pabellón Príncipe de Asturias	500

=== Team changes ===
Promoted from 2023–24 Segunda División B	Relegated from 2023–24 Primera División	Promoted to 2024–25 Primera División	Relegated to 2024–25 Segunda División B
(Galicia (Spain)) ADC Lugo Sala (Region of Murcia) Zambú CFS Pinatar (Valencian Community) Sporting FS La Nucía	(Valencian Community) Alzira FS (Andalusia) Real Betis Futsal	(Aragon) AD Sala 10 (Galicia (Spain)) CD Burela FS	(Valencian Community) Bisontes Castellón (Andalusia) Real Betis Futsal B (Andalusia) Atlético Mengíbar FS

== Teams promoted by year ==
Year	Teams
1994	Vijusa Valencia & Arnisal Pal/La Massana
1995	Ceuta Samsung & Rías Baixas
1996	Marsanz Torrejón & CEES Boadilla
1997	Alvic Jaén, Seat Martorell & Carnicer Fiat Torrejón
1998	Mínguez Sáez Cartagena, O Parrulo Indunor & MRA Carsal Xota
1999	Cefire Burela, Ourense & Foticos Zaragoza
2000	Móstoles, Barcelona & Valencia Vijusa
2001	Atlético Boadilla & Andorra
2002	Foticos Zaragoza & Café Candelas Lugo
2003	Gestesa Guadalajara & Autos Lobelle
2004	EDL Muebles Caloto & Povet.com Benicarló

Year	Teams
2005	Albacete FS & GSI Bilbo
2006	Gestesa Guadalajara & FC Barcelona
2007	Leis Pontevedra & Armiñana Valencia
2008	Fisiomedia Manacor, Marfil Santa Coloma & Tien21 P. Millenium Pinto
2009	Sala 10 Zaragoza & Arcebansa Zamora
2010	Grupo Empresas Talavera & Fisiomedia Manacor
2011	Puertollano & Ríos Renovables R.N.
2012	Gáldar Gran Canaria & Burela Pescados Rubén
2013	Montesinos Jumilla, Castell de Peñiscola Benicarló & Fuconsa Jaén
2014	Levante UD DM & Uruguay Tenerife
2015	UMA Antequera & Elche
