= Zaragoza-Goya railway station =

Railway station in Zaragoza, Spain

Zaragoza-Goya
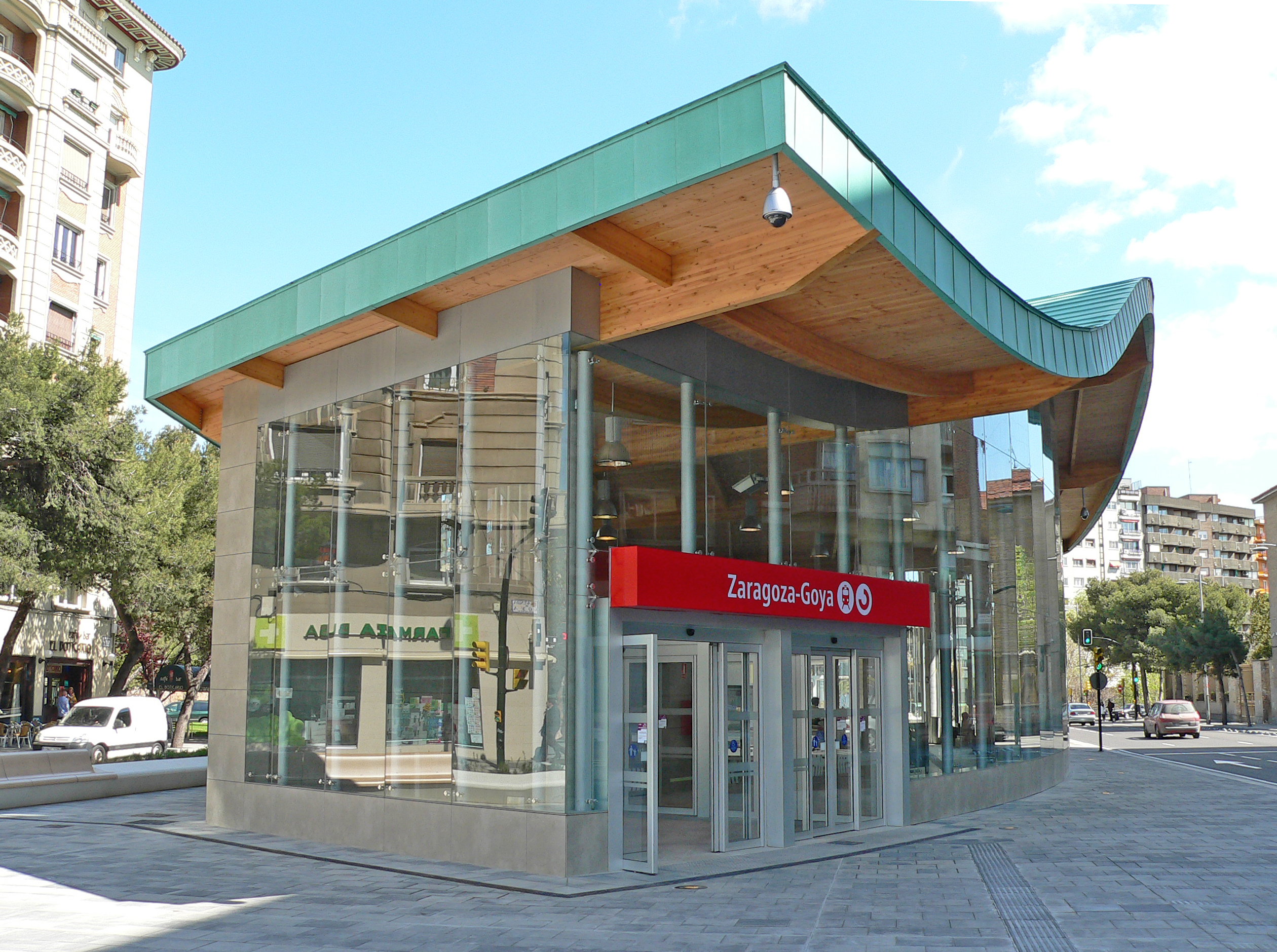
- Station's entrance

General information
- Location: Spain
- Coordinates: 41.64387°N 0.89105°W
- Lines: Renfe; Cercanías Zaragoza: Madrid–Barcelona railway
- Tracks: 2

Construction
- Structure type: Underground
- Platform levels: 1
- Accessible: Yes

History
- Opened: 3 April 2012

Passengers
- 2016-7: 469,165
Location

Zaragoza-Goya is an underground railway station opened on April 3, 2012 in the Spanish city of Zaragoza, Aragon. It serves as the main city centre station for Cercanías Zaragoza lines C-1 from Casetas to Miraflores, and some regional services. It is the only railway station in Zaragoza which interchanges with the Zaragoza tram.

== History ==
The station opened on April 3, 2012, with regular service beginning the following day. The total building cost was €44.5 million.

== Services ==
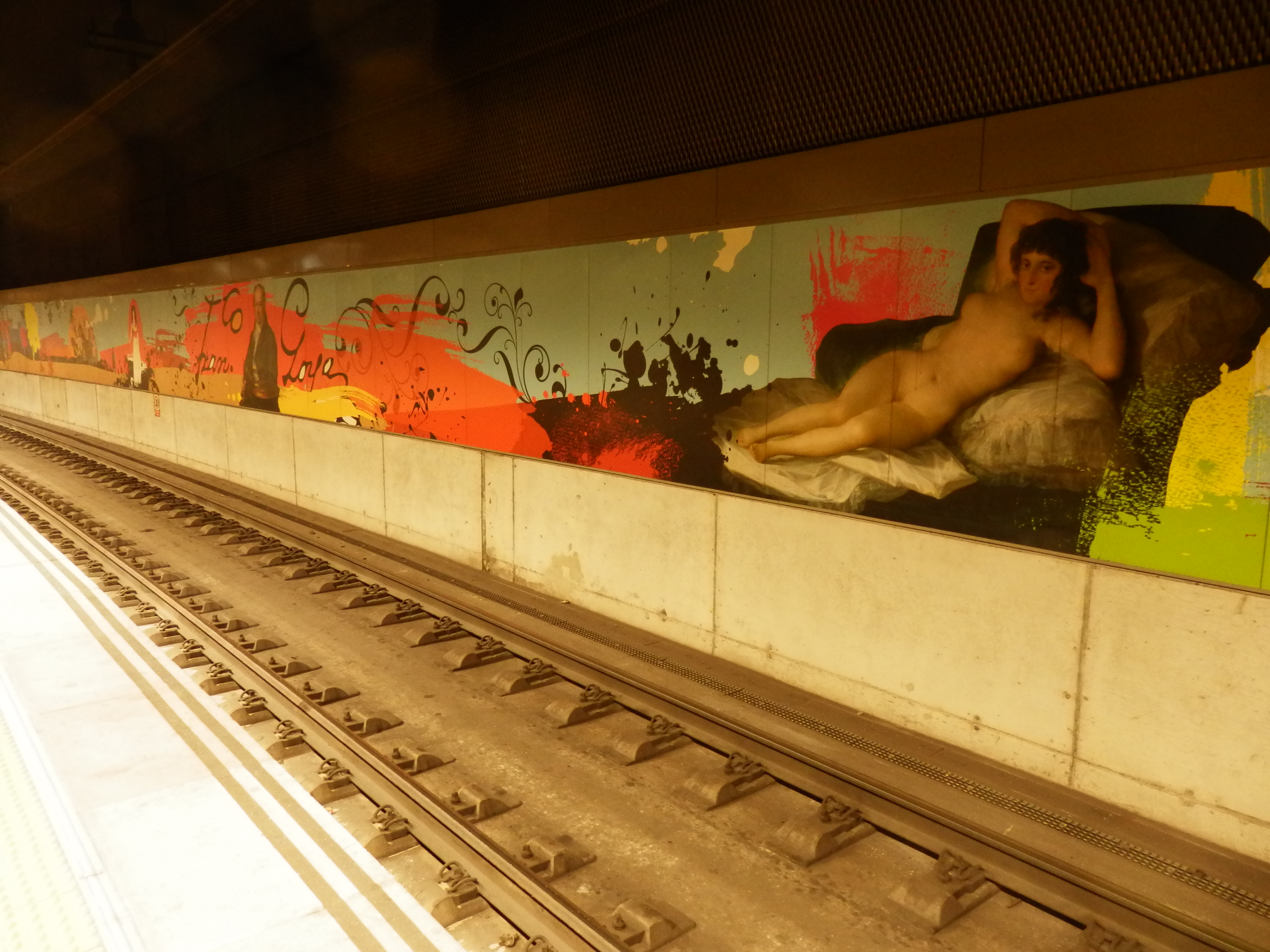
Underground platform

Zaragoza-Goya is primarily served by the Cercanías Zaragoza commuter rail line, with a frequency of every 60 minutes. Regional services to Logroño and Canfranc via Huesca also call at Goya.

Preceding station	Renfe Operadora	Following station
Zaragoza-Portillo towards Cartagena	Intercity	Miraflores Terminus
Zaragoza-Portillo towards Valencia Nord	Intercity	Miraflores Terminus
Zaragoza-Portillo towards Zaragoza-Delicias	Media Distancia 34	Miraflores towards Barcelona Sant Andreu Comtal
Zaragoza-Portillo towards Valencia Nord	Media Distancia 49	Miraflores towards Huesca
Zaragoza-Portillo towards Zaragoza-Delicias	Media Distancia 56	Miraflores towards Jaca
Zaragoza-Portillo towards Zaragoza-Delicias	Media Distancia 56	Miraflores towards Canfranc
Preceding station	Cercanías Zaragoza	Following station
Zaragoza-Portillo towards Casetas	C-1	Miraflores Terminus
