= Madrid, Zaragoza and Alicante railway =

Spanish pre-nationalisation railway (1856–1941)

- Compañía de los Ferrocarriles de Madrid a Zaragoza y Alicante
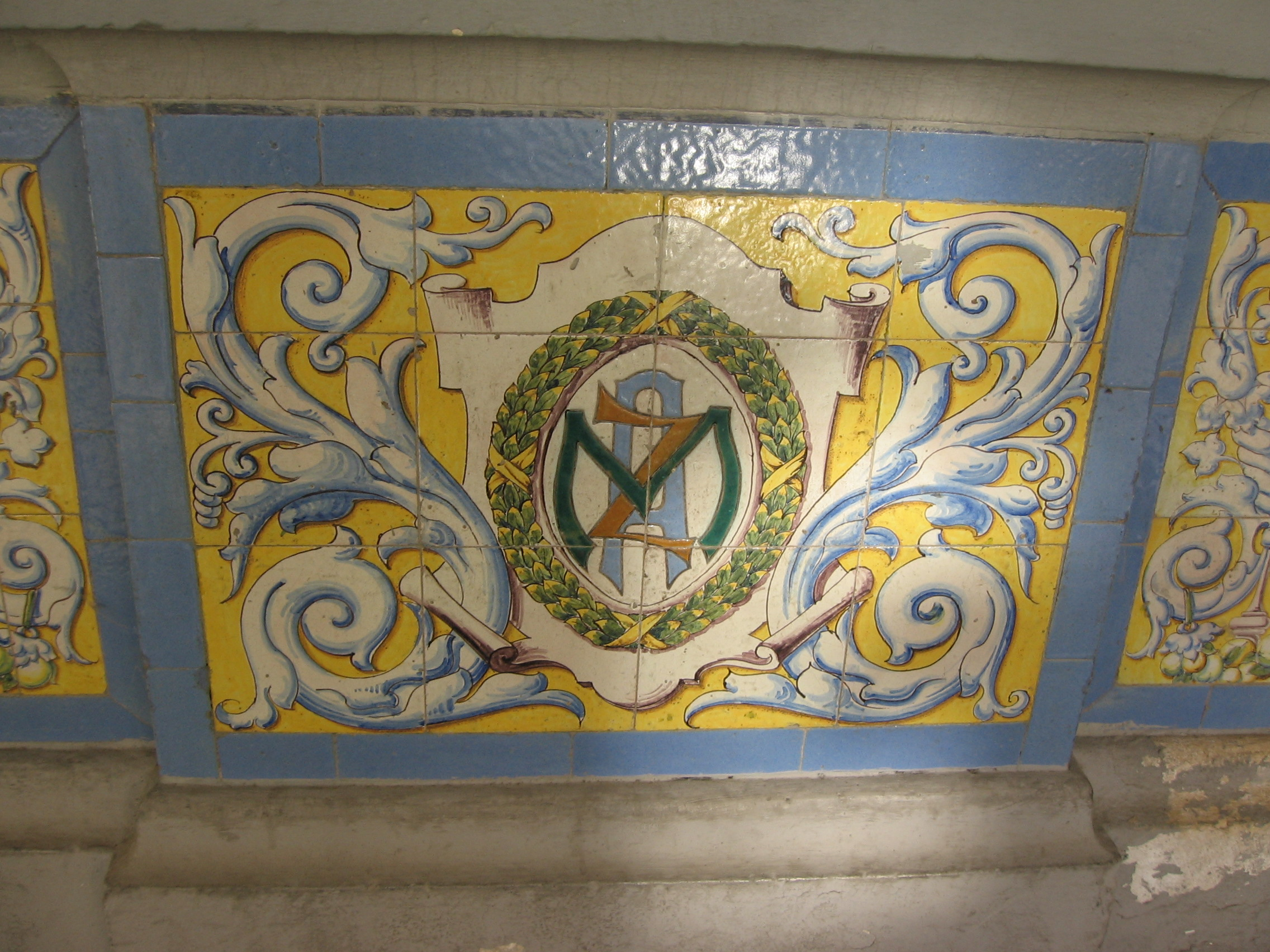
- Abbreviation: MZA
- Predecessor: CS; Sevilla-Huelva; Mérida-Sevilla; CRB; TBF; Duero
- Successor: RENFE
- Formation: December 31, 1856
- Founder: José de Salamanca Mayol; Society Rothschild.
- Dissolved: July 1, 1941
- Type: S.A.
- Headquarters: Madrid, Spain
- Products: Passenger and Freight Rail Transport
- Services: Transport, Rail transport
- Budget: 456000000 reales in 1856
- Staff: 12000

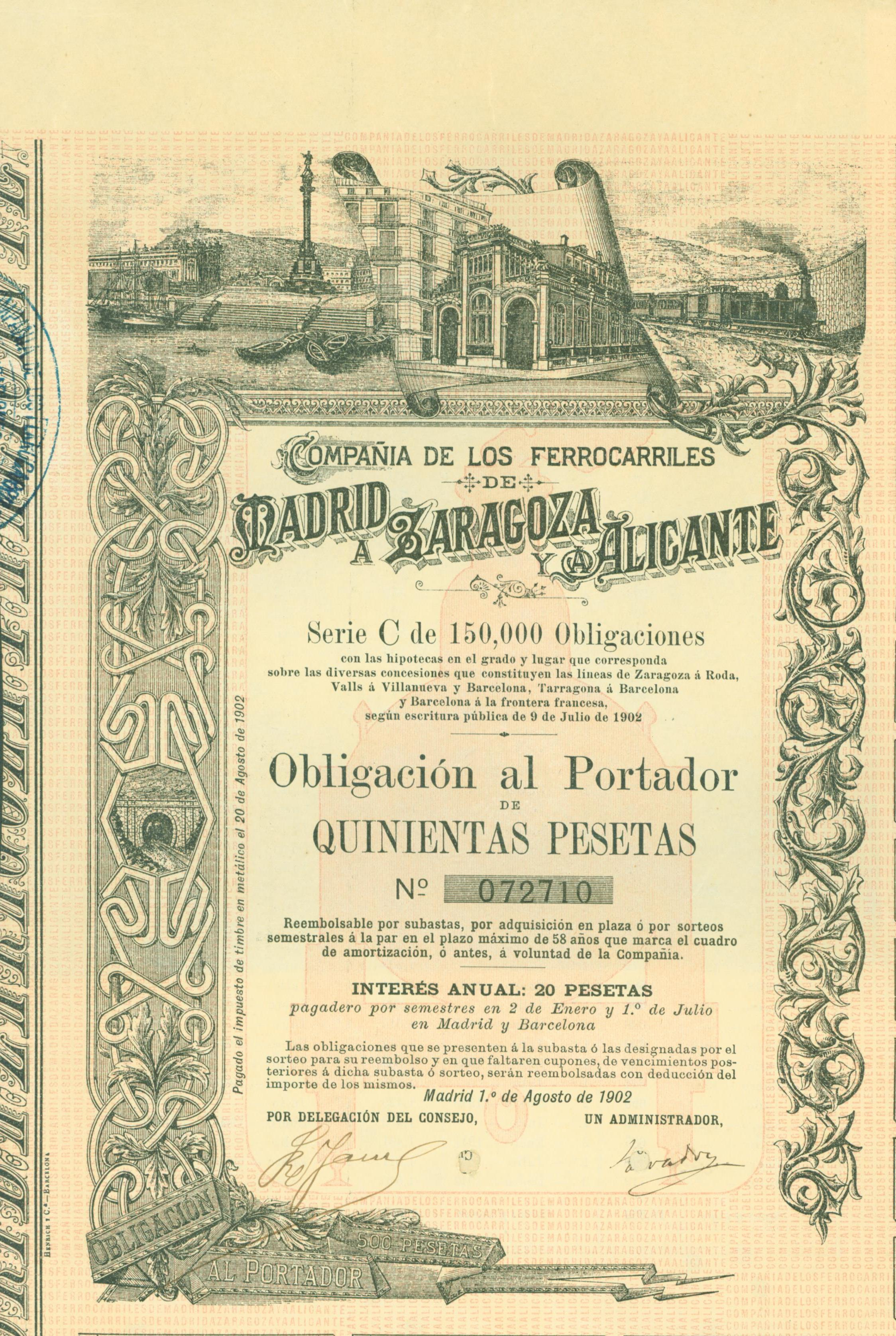
Bond of the Compañía de los Ferrocarriles de Madrid a Zaragoza y Alicante, issued 1 August 1902

The Madrid, Zaragoza and Alicante railway (MZA) - also known in Spanish as Compañía de los ferrocarriles de Madrid a Zaragoza y a Alicante - was a Spanish railway company founded in 1856 that became one of the most important companies in the railway sector, along with its great rival, the Compañía de los Caminos de Hierro del Norte de España (known simply as "Norte".)

The rivalry between MZA and Norte stemmed from competing financial families at the time, namely the Rothschilds and Pereires. MZA rapidly expanded its railway concessions to encompass key routes in Extremadura, New Castile, Andalusia, and Levante, thereby gaining control of a significant market. MZA also constructed Atocha Station in Madrid, del Carmen Station in Murcia, Campo Sepulcro (later El Portillo Station) in Zaragoza, and Plaza de Armas Station in Seville, which is also recognized as Cordoba Station and presently transformed into a shopping center.

At the turn of the 20th century, MZA reached its operational peak, but soon after, the company was hit by crisis. The Spanish Civil War marked the end for MZA, as the company was condemned when the Spanish State nationalized all broad gauge railways in 1941. As a result, MZA ceased to exist.

== Basic chronology ==
- On December 31, 1856, the Compañía de los Ferrocarriles de Madrid a Zaragoza y Alicante was founded by José de Salamanca Mayol, the representatives of the Rothschilds in Spain, etc.
- On May 16, 1863, the Madrid to Zaragoza Railway, which started in 1858, was finished, concluding the construction of rail lines during that era.
- On April 25, 1865, the Albacete to Murcia and Cartagena railway line was inaugurated, marking the second railway line in the Spanish Levant.
- On October 5, 1875, the Cordoba-Seville Railway was acquired, allowing for domination of the Guadalquivir valley and control over one of Spain's most important lines. This acquisition fulfilled one of the company's aspirations since the 1860s.
- On April 8, 1880, the Madrid-Ciudad Real-Badajoz Railway annexation introduced a new railway track to Ciudad Real and provided a connection to Extremadura and a route to Portugal.
- On January 16, 1885, the Mérida-Seville Railway was opened, signaling the conclusion of the expansion in the Extremadura region and connecting it with the Andalusian lines that had already been under control for some time.
- On December 8, 1892, the renovation of Atocha Station was completed, making it the main station of MZA and one of the most important in the country.
- On January 1, 1898, the merger of MZA and TBF became effective, as per the agreement signed several years earlier. The Madrid-Zaragoza-Alicante Company expanded its network in Catalonia and acquired significant railway traffic. The company's growth period ended with this merger.
- In 1925, the Catalan Network was definitively integrated into the MZA structure.
- In 1929, MZA inaugurated the Barcelona Terminus Station, its last major project before experiencing decline.
- On August 3, 1936, the Republican government nationalized the railway network it controlled during the Spanish Civil War. Consequently, the MZA was absorbed by the Red Nacional de Ferrocarriles in the area loyal to the Second Republic. Directors and managers who escaped to the rebel zone attempted to regain their previous power, but the military ultimately managed all aspects of the railway. Much of MZA's material and infrastructure were severely damaged and destroyed during the war.
- On July 1, 1941, the MZA Company ceased to exist, and its entire network, facilities, and rolling stock were incorporated into the newly established RENFE.

== Background ==
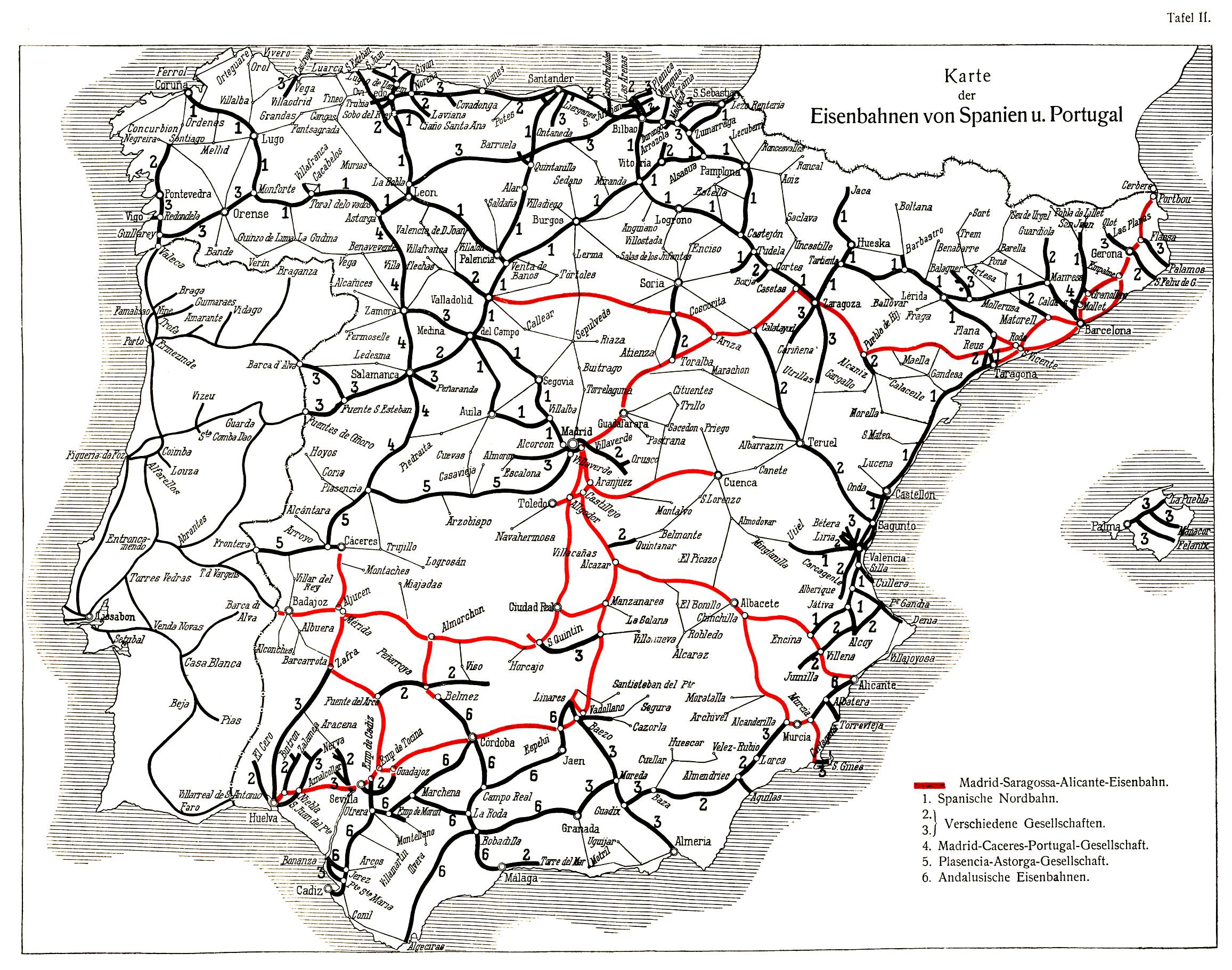
In red, the MZA network, circa 1921.

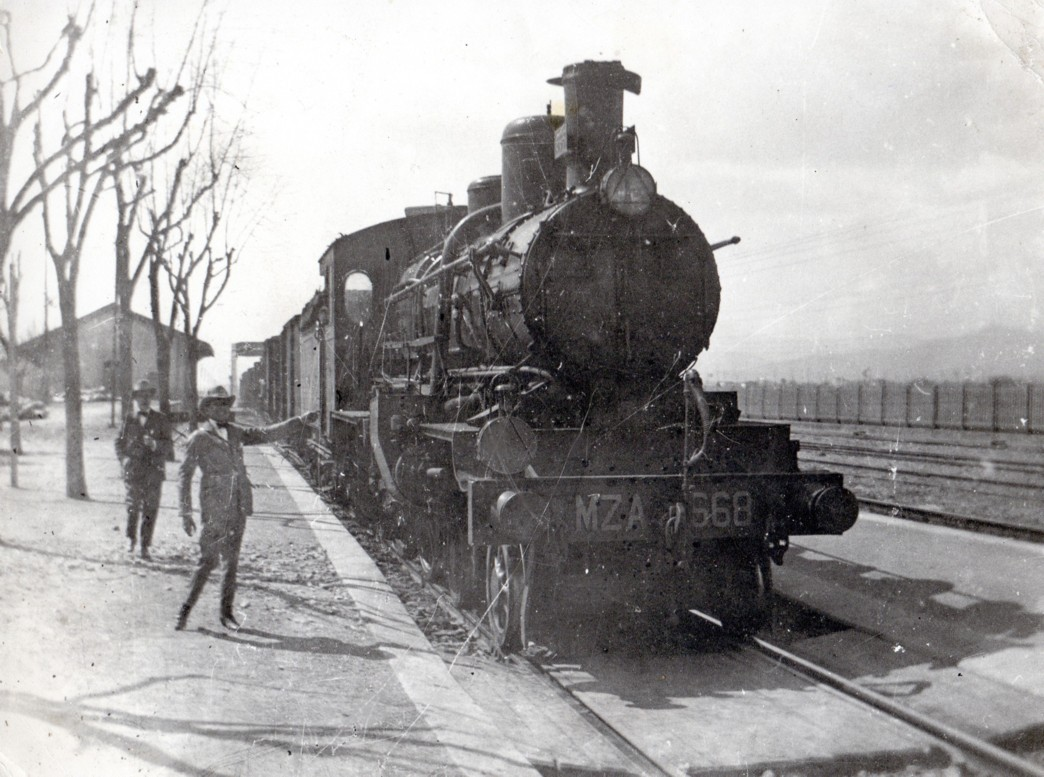
MZA 668 engine from 1920. Image from the Railway Historical Archive.

The company's origins can be traced back to the Madrid-Alicante railway concession, which originally belonged to the Compañía de Camino de Hierro de María Cristina, a company in which the Crown was involved, although at the time it was only an idea. Construction of this railway was in three stages, beginning with the inauguration of the Madrid-Aranjuez line in 1851 and its subsequent extension to Almansa and later to Alicante. José de Salamanca Mayol, who would become a prominent Spanish businessman in the 19th century, was involved in this construction project. With control over the completed line in 1856, the Marquis of Salamanca connected with wealthy French businessmen already invested in the railway industry in Spain.

The Rothschilds and others foresaw the creation of the Sociedad Española Mercantil e Industrial, which had Daniel Weisweiller and Ignacio Bauer as representatives, both of whom would play key roles in the future company. On the opposite side were the Duke of Morny and several French administrators of the Chemin de Fer du Grand Central. In the mid-1850s, Spain had few railway lines, despite significant projects in the previous decade aimed at linking all provincial capitals in the country. In 1845, the Spanish ambassador in London recommended and certain banks supported the proposition of a railway line connecting Madrid, Zaragoza, Pamplona, and Barcelona. A businessman took the initial measures for the State to grant it.

The ambitious Madrid-Zaragoza link project was abandoned prematurely due to various reasons. Despite this setback, the project did not fade away. The State declared the line of general interest and made its construction a priority starting from 1851. In 1855, more favorable conditions were offered under the law to encourage potential concessionaires. On February 24, 1856, the Madrid-Zaragoza railway concession was auctioned to the mentioned companies. The concession marked the potential start of a major route from Madrid to the border through the Pyrenees. The Madrid-Zaragoza line and numerous concessions in France enabled the creation of a vast international network. José de Salamanca, owner of Madrid-Aranjuez Railway, recognized a promising business opportunity and contacted the Rothschilds to propose merging their partially-operational Mediterranean line with a joint concession. However, José Campo was also interested in the business. The concession for the line was awarded on February 24, 1856, with five proposals on the table:

- Sociedad Española Mercantil e Industrial (Rothschild)
- Sociedad de Crédito Mobiliario Español (Péreire brothers)
- José de Salamanca
- José Campo y Mateu
- Chemin de Fer du Grand Central Group

The award was won by the latter group, which in its proposal asked for fewer subsidies from the State. In fact, it gained an advantage after the Rothschilds' agreement with the Marquis of Salamanca. The new company was formed by the Duke of Morny, owner of the Chemin de Fer du Grand Central; Weisweller and Baüer, representatives of the Rotschilds; and José de Salamanca, who contributed the Alicante line. The understanding that resulted between some of the bidders led to the birth of the new company in just a few months.

== Establishment ==
When the Madrid-Zaragoza railway was auctioned, it also sparked the idea of forming a new railway company to combine that line with the Madrid-Alicante line, which was under the ownership of the Marquis of Salamanca. Several names were proposed, including Compañía de los Ferrocarriles de los Pyrenees a Zaragoza y el Mediterráneo. However, the final choice was "Compañía de los Ferrocarriles de Madrid a Zaragoza y a Alicante" (Madrid, Zaragoza and Alicante railway, MZA), which was officially established on December 31, 1856, with a capital of 456 million reales divided into 240,000 shares.

The company's Board of Directors assembled on January 16, 1857. During this meeting, Alejandro Mon was elected president, and José de Salamanca became the vice-president. A central management committee was also formed in Paris. At that point, the company had established the Atocha station in Madrid, and the Madrid to Almansa line was operational, while the section to Alicante was under construction.

== Start of operations ==
Soon after its establishment, the company focused entirely on constructing the railway to Zaragoza. However, the preliminary project originally proposed building a Madrid station near Puerta de Recoletos (nowadays Plaza de Colón). Despite this, the company lacked interest in constructing a new station in Madrid. Consequently, the construction of the Aragon line commenced from Atocha station, and it proceeded without significant difficulties. In 1859, the railway had already reached Guadalajara, prompting MZA to establish a stagecoach service between the city and Zaragoza. By 1861, with further construction underway, MZA entered into an agreement with Compañía del Ferrocarril de Zaragoza a Pamplona to operate a Madrid-Paris service via Tudela, Pamplona, and Bayonne, designed to compete directly with Compañía de los Caminos de Hierro del Norte de España, and lasting 54 hours.

From the outset, MZA's leaders aimed to construct new branches to La Mancha, Extremadura, and even Andalusia. The Government developed a construction program and tendered some line contracts in support of this objective. On March 30, 1859, a law was passed to establish a new Andalusian line that would run from Manzanares to Malaga and Granada. The MZA secured a concession for the first two sections of this line on October 20, 1860. The auction at Alcazar de San Juan was scheduled for April 8, 1859. For unclear reasons, Bauer and Jose de Salamanca decided to employ the services of a front man - the wealthy local landowner, Marquis of Villamediana - who successfully obtained the concession against banker Guilhou. Finally, as agreed, the MZA received the concession on April 20. To conclude, on November 8, 1859, José de Salamanca was granted permission to construct a railway between Albacete and Cartagena. The transfer of this project to the MZA was authorized on April 30, 1860, by Royal Decree. Even though the track reached Guadalajara in the spring of 1859, it had to be transferred to a stagecoach service in Alhama de Aragon for a substantial period. The missing link was finally completed in May 1863. The initial years of operation were troublesome, and the initial French directors of the company were determined to enhance performance and turn a profit.

== Expansion of network in La Mancha and Andalusia ==
From the outset of the company, there were plans to expand the network to the southern regions in preparation for acquiring key routes to Andalusia and its ports, as well as through La Mancha. In December 1858, shortly after its establishment, the company made its initial acquisition, the Compañía del Ferrocarril de Castillejo a Toledo, owned by the Marquis of Salamanca. However, this annexation only entailed acquiring a small branch line to the historic city of Toledo. The La Mancha and Extremadura lines will follow soon, as well as those of Andalusia, which could commence in the great Madrid-Alicante line, the major Mediterranean line that runs through much of the lands of La Mancha.

Starting from Alcázar de San Juan station as a base, the railway line to Ciudad Real was established. The auction for the railway was announced on April 8, 1859. Initially, the Company planned to participate in the auction but later decided to do so indirectly through its advisors Salamanca and Baüer, who in turn negotiated an agreement with the Marquis of Villamediana. He presented himself at the auction and won by reducing his bid for the State subsidy from 18 to 15 million dollars. The concession was granted to Antonio de Lara, Marquis of Villamediana, who then ceded it to MZA on April 20. Construction began immediately.

Construction on the line progressed smoothly due to the absence of challenging geographic features. The stretches from Alcázar to Manzanares were completed in June 1860, followed by Daimiel on October 1 of that year. Finally, Ciudad Real was reached on March 14, 1861, even as work on the Zaragoza line was yet to be completed.

With the railway passing through Manzanares, the company decided to use it as the starting point for a derivation towards Andalusia. This wasn't the first time the idea of connecting Madrid to the Andalusian region had been discussed, far from it. There was already a precedent in 1856 when the Grand Central received a concession to start from Madrid-Almansa and enter the province of Jaen, then continue to Cordoba through the valley of Guadalquivir. This project ultimately failed, leading to the MZA launching a new project that received approval through a new Royal Order on March 30, 1859. This new project divided the railway route into four sections:

1. Manzanares to Andujar
2. Andujar to Cordoba
3. Cordoba to Malaga
4. Campillos (Malaga) to Granada

However, the MZA was only interested in the first two sections, and was concerned that an independent auction would lose it Section II, which was easier to build. With the aid of the government, it consolidated sections I and II, and scheduled an auction on October 20, 1860, which the influential company confidently won. Sections III and IV would be retained by Jorge Loring y Oyarzábal and become a part of Compañía del Ferrocarril de Córdoba a Málaga. MZA was extremely confident in winning the auction as work started between Manzanares and Torrenueva merely days later.

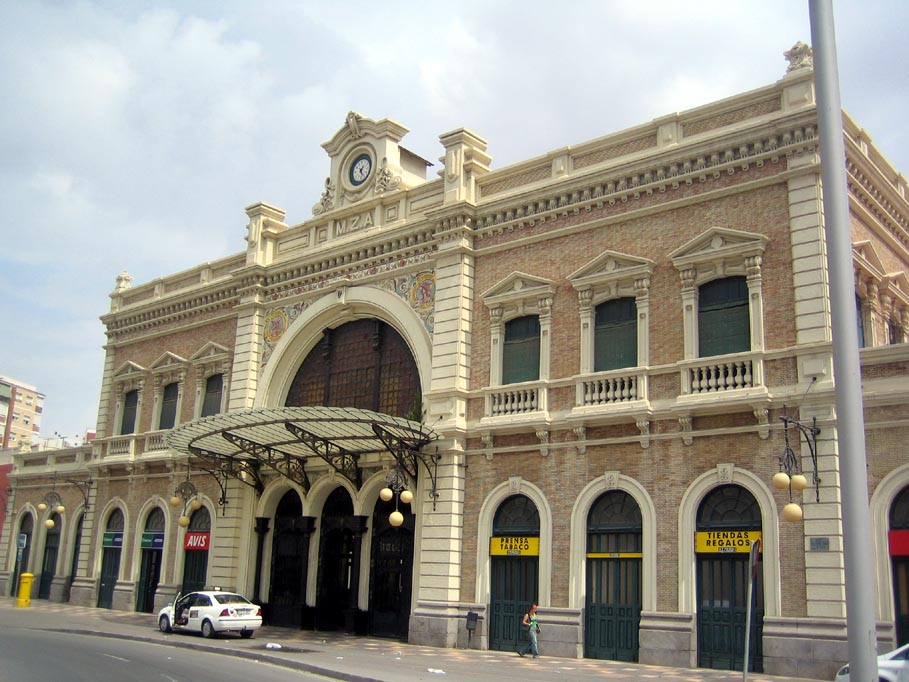
Modernist Cartagena station of the Madrid-Cartagena line was inaugurated in 1862.

Cartagena's position on the Mediterranean and its military arsenal made it significant to both the railway and MZA. Several alternatives were studied for the construction of a branch line to Murcia and Cartagena from the Madrid-Alicante line since 1852. Eventually, the concession for the railway which would pass through Albacete was put up for auction by the government in 1860. José de Salamanca won the concession, as he had on previous occasions, and subsequently transferred it to MZA. Despite controversies around the connection point of the branch line that would ultimately lead to Cartagena, Albacete was able to succeed and by 1863, several sections had already been inaugurated, including the Murcia-Cartagena section. Although the railway service was already operating in the southern section of the line, discussions cleared the way for fast-paced work to be completed in the northern section. The entire 240-kilometer line was officially completed on April 27, 1865. The junction point, which had been subject to much controversy, was ultimately located at Chinchilla, near Albacete.

== Zaragoza railway completion ==
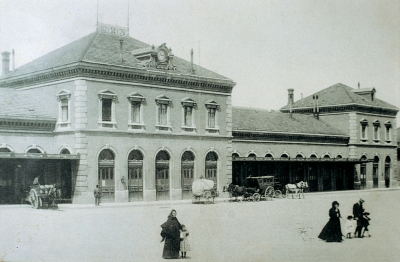
Image of the Campo Sepulcro station (Zaragoza-Portillo station), the MZA station in the Aragonese capital, at the beginning of the 20th century.

By 1859, the railway had extended up to Guadalajara. Subsequently, a combined service of stagecoaches linked with the Aragonese capital. Construction work continued in the ensuing years despite facing some economic and geographical challenges, until finally reaching Aragonese lands. The railway had already made its way to Alhama de Aragon by the start of 1863. Soon afterwards, it reached Zaragoza, leading to the official inauguration of the railway line on May 16, 1865. Although the line only extended to Zaragoza at present, the city was already benefiting from the traffic that passed through Lleida from Barcelona. Nonetheless, MZA did not yet have a railway that directly connected it with the city of Barcelona.

== Operations (1865-1875) ==
These years were marked by crisis rather than good results. This period coincided with the economic downturn at the end of Isabella II's reign, as well as her widespread disapproval among many sectors of Spanish society. The Glorious Revolution erupted in 1868, leading to the Six-year Democracy. Following the rebels' success in Alcolea, the queen was forced into exile, and a temporary government was established. The next five years experienced the rule of Amadeo I, the declaration of the First Republic, the onset of the cantonal rebellion, and persistent political instability. In 1875, the Bourbons regained the monarchy under Alfonso XII. This tumultuous political climate affected the company's financial records and future. In 1865, the company experienced severe financial difficulties. These struggles were compounded by a fierce dispute with the Compañía del Norte. However, the greatest threat to the company's survival came in 1868 with an economic crisis. Despite these challenges, Cipriano Segundo Montesino, the first Spaniard to hold this position, assumed management of the company in the following year. Through his leadership, he successfully revived and ultimately saved the company by addressing the root of the problem.

After one year in office, he made some changes to train operations and reduced expenses while increasing operating profits. He also reached an agreement with Norte for traffic distribution and other matters. In 1871, he replaced the old iron rails with steel rails resulting in dividends for shareholders in 1873. The MZA had a network spanning 1428 km and was poised for expansion, not through new construction, but by acquiring and incorporating existing lines facing economic hardship.

== Railway expansion after 1875 ==
The revolution of 1868 and the financial crisis that the company endured caused the directors to refrain from requesting new concessions. By 1875, after the most significant challenges had been overcome, the MZA could enter a new phase of expansion, resulting in the addition of roughly 1,189 km of existing lines to the MZA network.

The initial rescue had strong political implications and served as a means of reconciliation with Norte. The latter agreed to give up its Andalusian firm, and in return, the MZA did not hinder the recovery of the ZPB. The merger ultimately involved Compañía de los Ferrocarriles de Zaragoza a Pamplona y Barcelona by Norte. The Cordoba-Seville Railway Company was in dire straits for the future, prompting it to seek a merger by engaging in talks with other railway companies. In contrast to its terrible relations with the Seville-Jerez-Cadiz Railway Company, the small company had established good relations with MZA. Thus, on October 5, 1875, MZA acquired Compañía del Ferrocarril de Córdoba a Sevilla and its 132 kilometers of operational lines, along with the line from La Reunión mines to Villanueva del Río y Minas. This allowed Madrid to Zaragoza and Alicante Company to connect this railway with its own, which reached Cordoba and enabled access to the Andalusian region's capital.

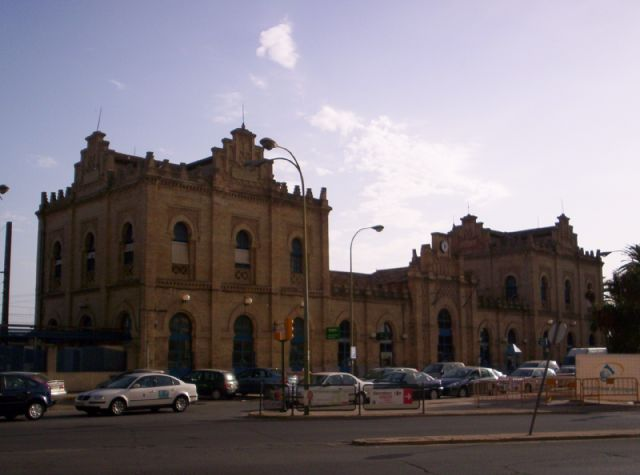
The Huelva station where the MZA tracks ended in the south of Spain.

The MZA acquired the Compañía de los Ferrocarriles de Sevilla a Huelva in 1877, following negotiations that began in 1876. This expansion included 111 km of partly completed lines that faced significant difficulties and would not be finished until 1880. The acquisition also included the use of the Huelva station, which was commissioned in 1880 and remained operational with RENFE until 2018. The MZA executives, who owned railways and had a foothold in various Mediterranean ports, believed that establishing a port on the Atlantic would boost their network traffic by expanding operations to additional countries. Unfortunately, this aspiration would remain unfulfilled.

The Ciudad Real to Badajoz line was opened on November 22, 1866, under the ownership of the Compañía de los Caminos de Hierro de Ciudad Real a Badajoz. Subsequently, the company expanded its network by adding a new branch to Madrid, which was finished by 1879. Nevertheless, the company had shifted towards a business model that impeded its long-term survival. Since the beginning of 1879, both companies have been entering into agreements, including one for the distribution of traffic. Eventually, this led to the annexation by MZA. On April 8, 1880, the absorption of the Compañía de los Caminos de Hierro de Ciudad Real a Badajoz increased the network by an additional 510 km and most importantly, provided an exit to Portugal.

Delicias station, formerly known as the Compañía de Ciudad Real-Badajoz station and located in the capital, was not acquired by MZA due to their ownership of the much larger Atocha station. Instead, they sold Delicias to the recently established Compañía de los Ferrocarriles de Madrid a Cáceres y Portugal, who ultimately acquired it. The merger policy was finalized with the rescue of the Compañía del Ferrocarril de Mérida a Sevilla in 1880, although it was granted with the concession since the line works had not begun yet. By 1881, both ends of the line were completed and operational. Finally, on January 16, 1885, the entire line between Mérida and Seville opened to the public. The joining of the Ciudad Real-Badajoz and Cordoba-Seville-Huelva lines marked the completion of MZA's southern annexation phase, making this annexation pivotal.

=== Operations (1875-1895) ===
Alcudia bridge disaster (April 27, 1884), with 59 deaths and 56 injured: the largest railway disaster in Spain to date.

In addition to the annexations and the expansion of the railways, the MZA carried out a policy adapted to the situation of the country. During this period, known as the Restoration, there was a significant economic upturn, with strong commercial activity and, above all, strong industrial expansion. This situation required the railways to adapt the existing rolling stock of the companies and to improve the network and facilities. In 1876, the company purchased 400 new wagons, which eventually increased to 1000 units. In the same period, MZA underwent modernization which included the commissioning of the first express between Madrid and Seville in 1878. The following year, another express began operating between Madrid, Lleida, and Barcelona. Wagons-Lits equipment was put into service on the Andalusia express on April 16, 1883, and a successful braking system test was conducted on the same express on May 8, 1886.

The railway construction from Aranjuez to Cuenca began in 1884. The line had already been designated for construction by state concession prior to 1880 and was acquired by MZA from the previous construction company. With MZA, the construction was fast and the circulation of trains was ready on September 5, 1885. The line's operation was subpar because it ended in Cuenca rather than continuing to Utiel, which already had a railway, and directly on to Valencia. Despite requests from provincial figures, MZA disregarded them and continued in this manner until well into the 20th century. MZA also planned to construct another rail link with the North, which would begin at Ariza (on the Madrid-Zaragoza railway) and extend to Valladolid, passing through Aranda de Duero.

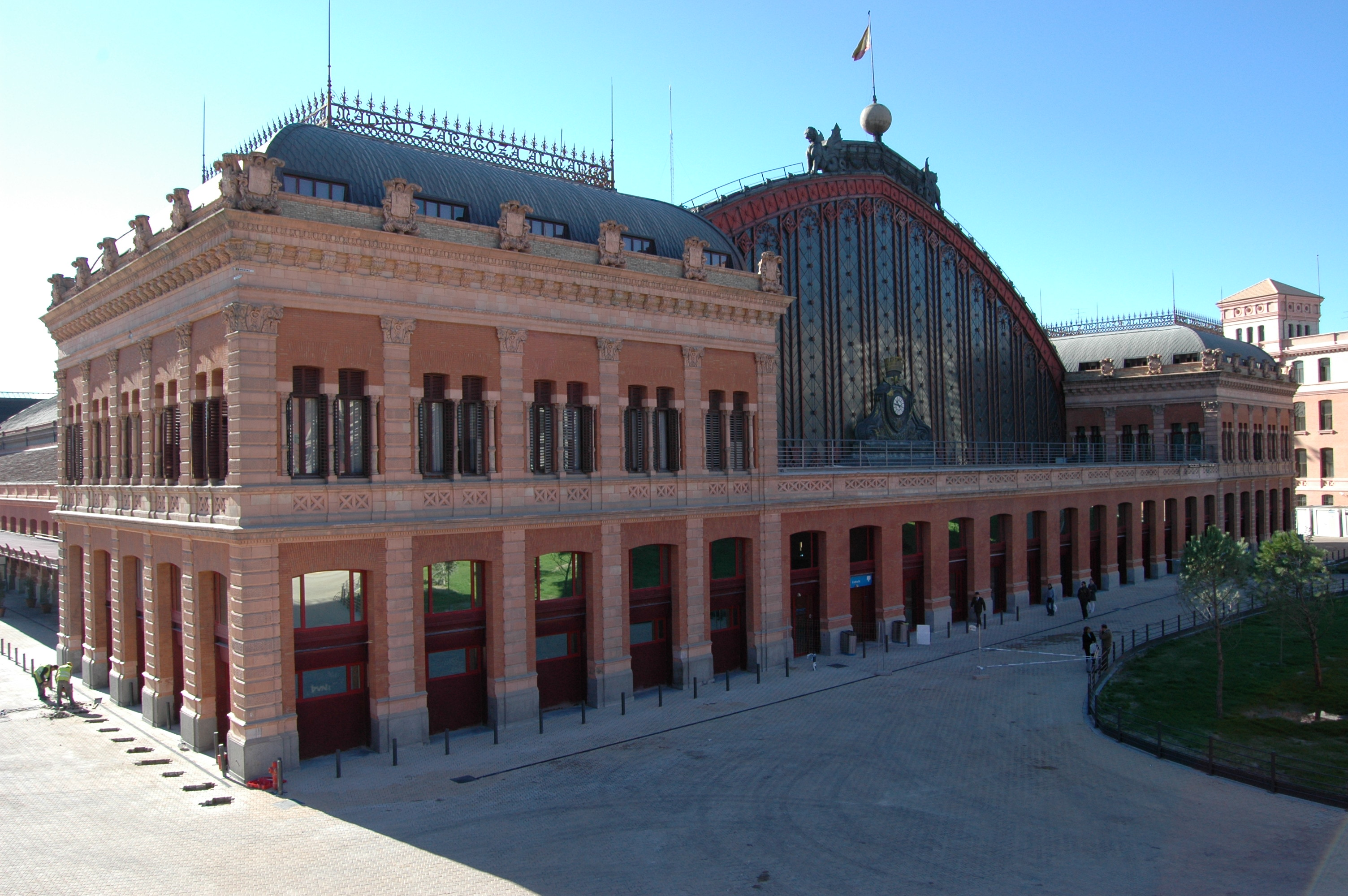
Image of the Atocha station in Madrid, turned into the head and symbol of MZA. As it looked after the last major refurbishment of the classic station was completed in 1992.

Conceived as a strategic railway line according to government plans, it became operational on January 1, 1895, marking the end of MZA's railway construction. In contrast, MZA undertook improvements to renovate the Atocha station around 1880. The aim was to transform the small and antiquated building, which was inadequate to meet the needs of the time. In 1889, the company initiated the extension of Madrid-Atocha station after the City Council of Madrid completed works in the area, which until then had been abandoned. The canopy that exists today, with multiple platforms reflecting the volume of trains moving at that time, was finished in 1892.

=== Expansion into Catalonia ===
In 1885, the civil engineer Eduardo Maristany Gibert (1855-1941) (grandson of Manuel Gibert, president of the primitive Compañía del Camino de Hierro de Barcelona a Mataró) joined the Compañía de los ferrocarriles de Tarragona a Barcelona y Francia (TBF). At the time, the TBF was building a direct line from Barcelona to Zaragoza, on a route much further south than the one operated by the Compañía del Norte via Lleida and Manresa. TBF was already in communication with MZA regarding a potential merger. TBF found it more practical to merge its new line connecting Zaragoza to Barcelona via Caspe with MZA's line connecting Madrid to Zaragoza, creating a single company to link the two main Spanish cities. This approach differed from TBF's original plans, which were inherited from the now-defunct Compañía de los Ferrocarriles Directos de Madrid y Zaragoza y Barcelona, absorbed by TBF.

A branch line was established as a result of the merger agreements and commenced service on June 15, 1887. The line integrated the Valls-Villanueva-Barcelona (VVB) line into the city's network of links by connecting a point of the ex-VVB near the Llobregat River with the Bordeta fork on the line from Tarragona and Martorell that led to Aragon Street. With the completion of this railway link in 1887, the "Catalan eight" was established. It enabled train travel from Barcelona to different locations in the province of Girona, along the coast (Mataró) or inland (Granollers). Moreover, this connection extended southwards to several towns in the province of Tarragona, along the coast (Villanueva y Geltrú - VVB line) or inland (Martorell - "Centro" line). Prior to the partnership, it was agreed that MZA would construct the 254 km Valladolid-Ariza Railway line to establish a stronghold in Castilla la Vieja, a region traditionally controlled by Compañía del Norte. Similarly, TBF would be responsible for the completion of the direct line from Caspe.

However, Caminos de Hierro del Norte was interested in acquiring TBF, particularly after having acquired Sociedad de los Ferrocarriles de Almansa a Valencia y Tarragona, which was the next step. It attempted to halt the ongoing negotiations, but MZA countered with a bond issue on the Paris market. Once sufficient funds were raised, MZA was able to obtain TBF and ultimately succeeded in winning the wager against Norte.

In 1891, an agreement was signed in the French capital, leading to the expansion of the MZA network many kilometers to the Northeast in 1898. Despite purchasing TBF, it did not disappear but rather remained. Due to the inability to immediately harmonize the customs, signaling systems, and loading gauges of the two companies, a certain level of differentiation persisted between the Old Network (referring to the original MZA) and the Catalan Network (formerly known as TBF).

== 20th century ==
=== Operations (1898-1936) ===
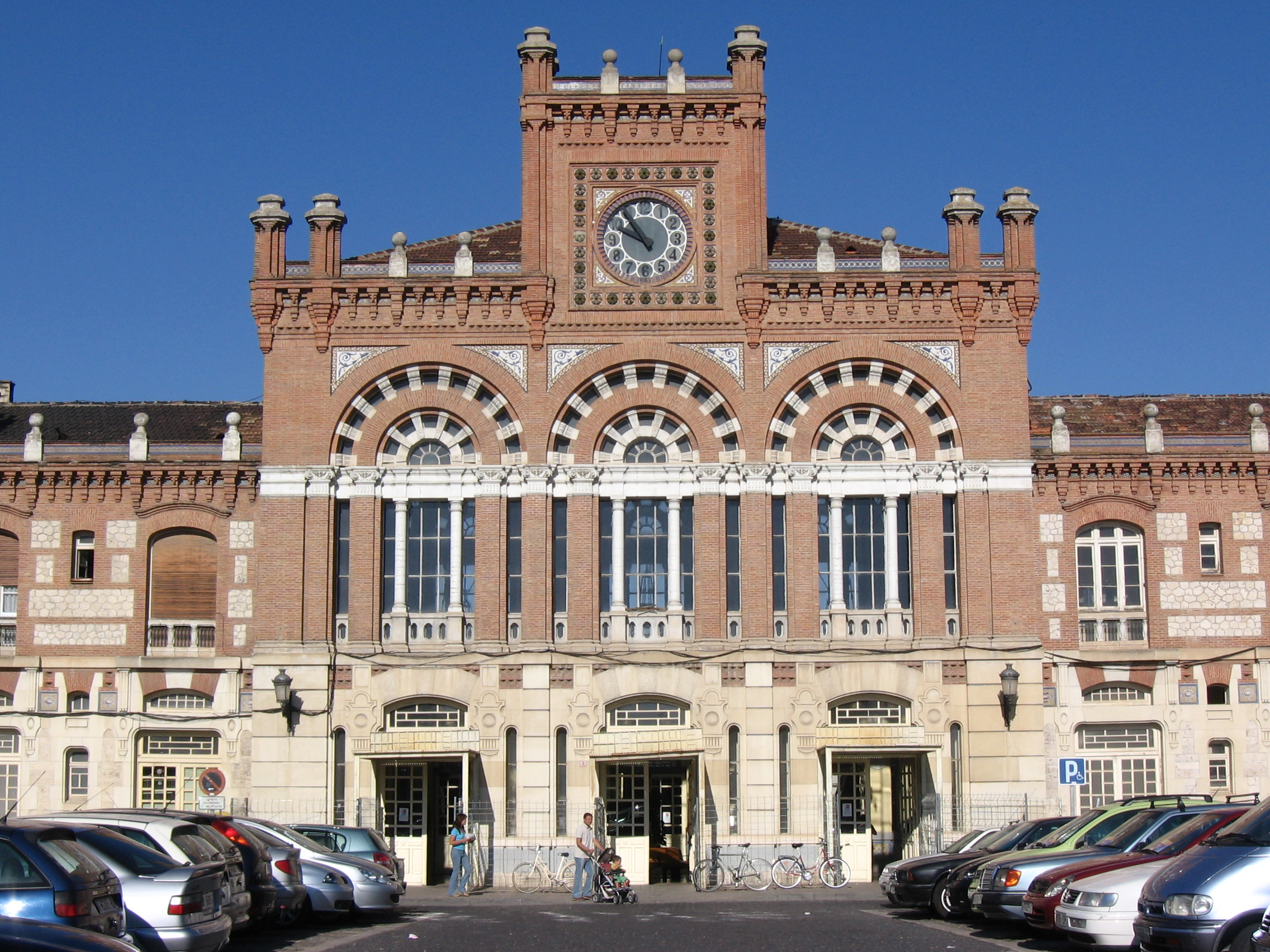
Façade of the Aranjuez station, neo-Mudejar style and one of the most beautiful in the network.

By the turn of the century, MZA had undergone considerable transformation. It had expanded from 287 kilometers of track and 37 locomotives in 1856 to 3679 kilometers of track, 392 locomotives, 9,000 cars and wagons, and almost 11,000 employees by 1900. At the start of the 20th century, MZA and MTM (La Maquinista Terrestre y Marítima) had a strong economic relationship. MTM was frequently placing orders with MZA for materials, making them a regular client. This caught the attention of Madrid-Alicante, who considered buying shares in MTM to gain a percentage of the company and secure better prices for future orders.

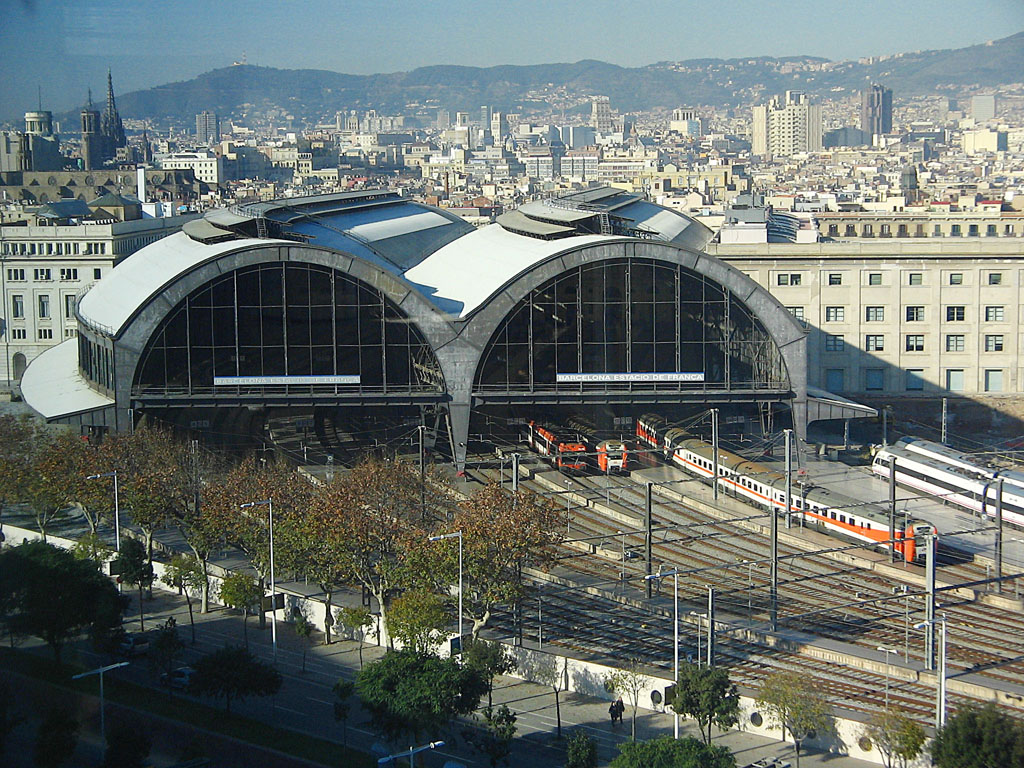
France station in Barcelona, completed in 1929, was one of the last works carried out in the construction of large stations.

The integration of the Catalan Network progressed as the century progressed, and this became more evident when the Traction Service was governed entirely from Madrid from 1908 onwards. In 1925, the two entities were definitively united. A gradual modernization of the network and facilities began, in accordance with the new situation in the new century. On the one hand, the construction of double track began on some sections of the MZA network: it already existed between Barcelona and Molins de Rey with the TBF, while in 1900 a second track was added to the section between Barcelona and Mataró. The experience was repeated in the central region, specifically in the Madrid-Getafe section, in 1913. The following year, the double track extended till Alcázar de San Juan. The network modernization also covered other areas such as marshalling yards and freight stations, which were independent of the large passenger stations' traffic. Among these, the Barcelona-Morrot station, which opened in 1917, and located next to the port of Barcelona, was remarkable. It was equipped with advanced technology for processing and storing goods.

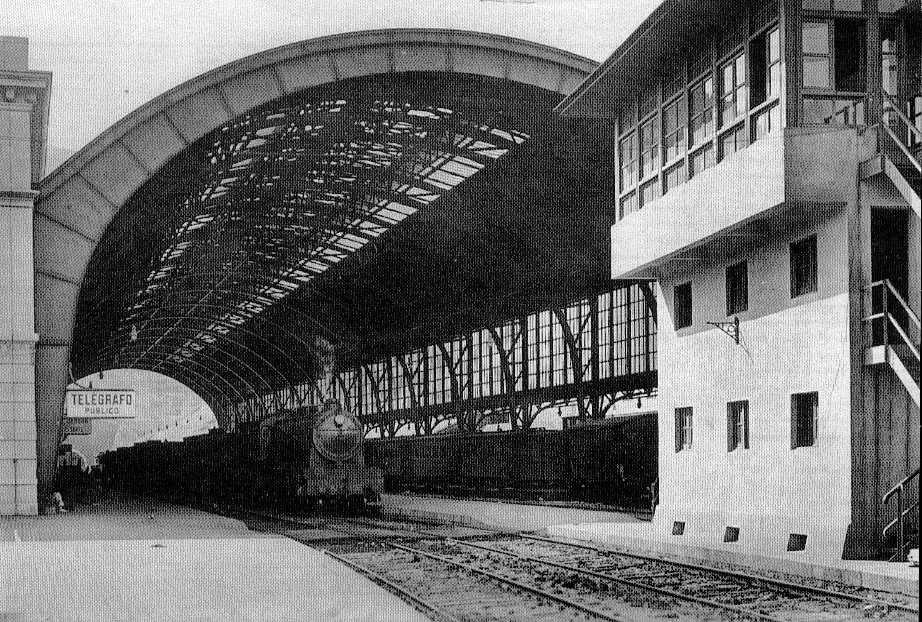
Portbou station, inaugurated by MZA in 1929 as a replacement of the previous one from 1870. It was one of the most important of its network due to its large passenger and freight traffic.

MZA was not exempt and, like other companies, needed to adjust prices to the current situation. As a result, many pending reforms, as well as the modernization of facilities and rolling stock, were delayed or cancelled. This led to a critical situation. The company was able to survive for a few more years, until the start of Primo de Rivera's dictatorship in 1924, when the Railway Statute was introduced. This statute established state aid and subsidies for various railway companies to enhance their outdated and obsolete network and rolling stock. MZA utilized this aid to enhance its network and complete various construction works, including the Barcelona terminus station which was finished in 1929. Other stations from this time period that are notable include Portbou, which was also inaugurated in 1929, and Aranjuez, which was built between 1922 and 1929. The company experienced its best results in its history during the 1920s, thanks to state aid and the company's modernization plan. The company rapidly recovered and grew during this time, but it ended in 1930–1931. Following the Crash of 1929 and the refusal of new Republican governments to recognize the validity of the Railway Statute of 1924, the company's accounts declined along with the overall economic crisis. The question of state aid had reached the point where the state maintained the railways but had no say in their management.

The issue of salaries was under control during the dictatorship, but the new Republic legislation caused an increase in low wages. This complicated the company's survival further. The economic results of 1935 were catastrophic, and the company soon realized that this situation could not be sustained. The nationalization of railways was a consistent topic of discussion, but political instability within the republican governments hindered any effective actions. As a result, the MZA Company persisted with its complex existence.

=== Civil War and integration in RENFE ===
The Spanish Civil War outbreak also left a mark on the history of this company, as it did in many other situations. The war split the company's assets, facilities, and fleet in two, as the management was situated in Madrid. The leaders and directors located in the Republican zone had to hastily evacuate to the rebel zone due to severe pressure from the militia and workers' committees. Starting on July 18, 1936, the workers' and railwaymen's committees became the real authorities in control of the company. The war situation prompted the Republican government to nationalize all railways within its zone in order to guarantee control, although in practice they were collectivized by committees of workers and railwaymen. Thus, on August 3, 1936, the MZA Company was dissolved within the Republican zone, merging instead with the Red Nacional de Ferrocarriles (not to be confused with the later Red Nacional de los Ferrocarriles Españoles or RENFE). However, the company continued to operate within the Francoist zone while members of the prior management who had fled to the rebel zone attempted to restore the company with available resources. Despite being the legal owners and having reconstructed the organization, the Francoist military authorities would direct and administer everything related to the railways because they were crucial for the war.

After the war, the company's facilities, railway network, and rolling stock suffered the consequences of the country's devastation. Despite their efforts to return to pre-war conditions, the railway companies' economic situation was dire, and they struggled to stay afloat. In the aftermath of the war, the Francoist government assumed control of major corporations without impinging on their autonomy, albeit briefly. In early 1941, RENFE was established, leading to the assimilation of the former MZA on July 1 of that year and the cessation of its operations.

=== Legacy of MZA ===
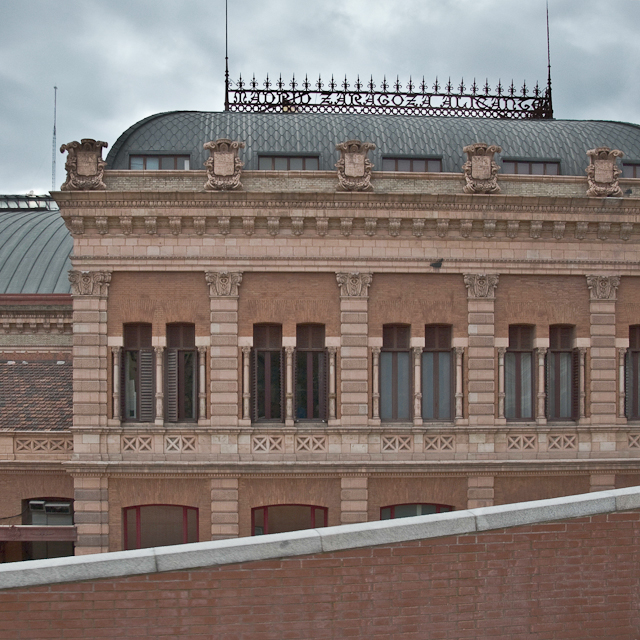
Sides of Atocha Station: The top features a preserved legend reading "Madrid-Zaragoza-Alicante", a remnant from the time it was known as Central MZA.

Although the company officially ceased to exist in 1941 upon its integration into RENFE, this did not result in the complete elimination of all the traces it left behind. In many small yet significant details, the legacy of MZA continues to exist, as evidenced in places such as the train stations in Murcia and Cartagena. Even at Atocha station in Madrid, one can spot the inscription "Madrid-Zaragoza-Alicante" on the upper part of the walls, a distant reminder of the company's period of glory. Alternatively, some stations have preserved their original design and functionality from the time of MZA, including Aranjuez station, Barcelona-Término, and Portbou. Still other stations have preserved their design but have lost their railway function, as in the case of Plaza de Armas station in Seville.

And it is that in numerous (and sometimes unnoticed) details has remained the brand or the acronym of MZA, as is the case of the stations of Murcia or Cartagena. At Atocha station in Madrid, the legend Madrid-Zaragoza-Alicante can still be seen on the upper part of the sides, a distant memory of its period of splendor under the company. On the other hand, many stations maintain their original structure and use from the time of MZA, citing cases such as Aranjuez station, Barcelona-Término or Portbou, while other stations have maintained their structure, but have lost their railway use, as in the case of Plaza de Armas station in Seville.

== Financial results ==
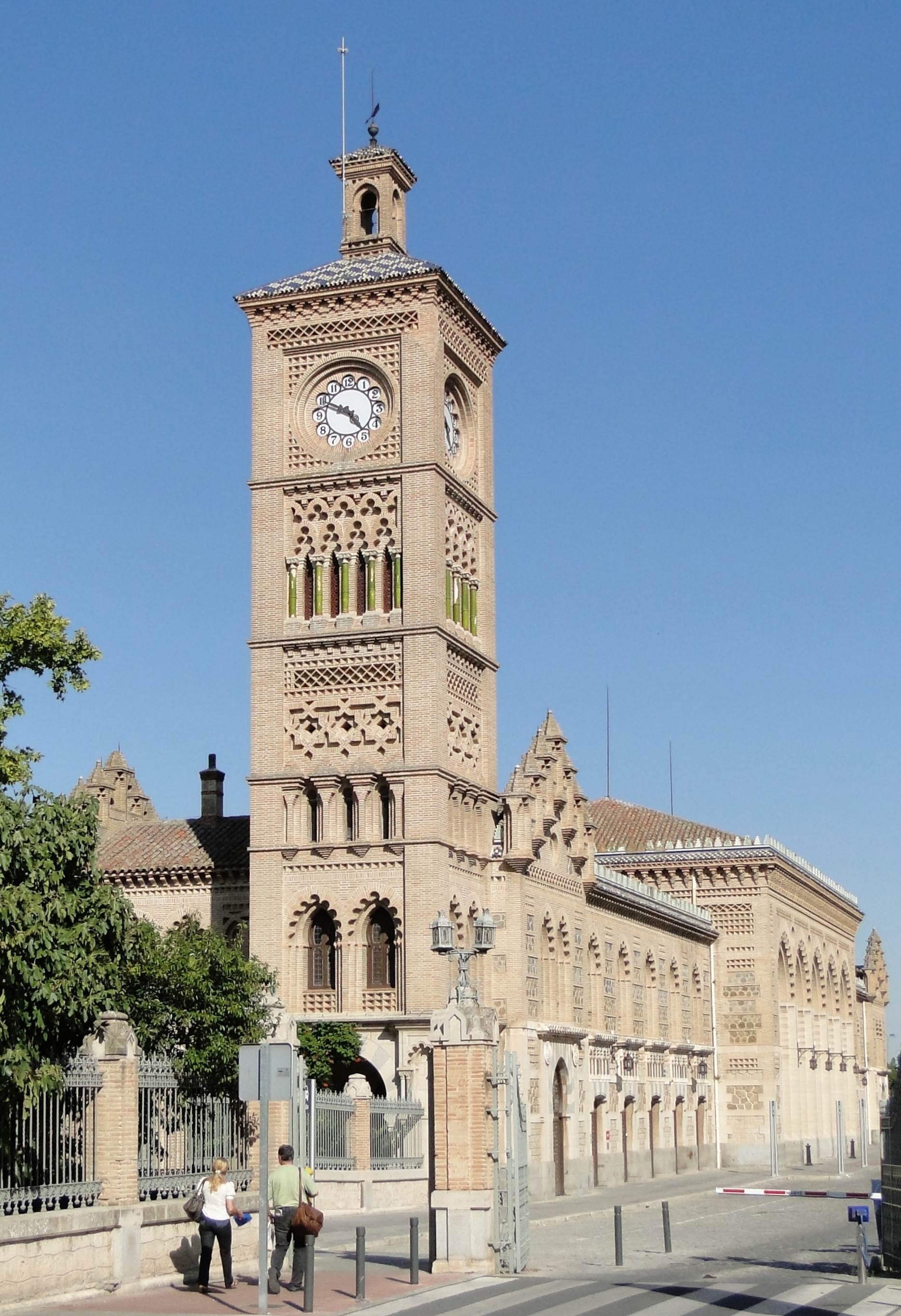
Toledo Station, inaugurated in 1919.

The table below displays the passengers and goods transported by MZA from 1865 to 1935. Additionally, the third column shows the percentage of operational results based on the earned income.

Year	Travelers transported (passengers)	Merchandise transported (tons)	Operating income on revenues
1865	1571700	554700	▲54.1%
1875	1853100	895100	▲62.8%
1882	2380900	1884700	▼60.0%
1888	2629000	1955500	▼59.7%
1894	2574700	2119200	▲65.0%
1902	10339600	5336700	▼59.7%
1907	12697600	6495900	▼54.4%
1917	18079500	10063400	▼45.5%
1921	26007800	8389200	▼16.1%
1928	29048800	12206900	▲26.9%
1935	26241800	8754700	▼16.7%

This table shows the income, expenses and operating results of the company's accounts between 1861 and 1935. The final results were obtained by subtracting from the last column the liabilities (basically, the financial burden of paying the bondholders), which were always more than 75% of the operating result.

Year	Operating income	Operating expenses	Surplus
1861	17322700 pts.	7948200 pts.	▲9374500 pts.
1866	22430500 pts.	10737400 pts.	▲11693100 pts.
1871	26997000 pts.	9633000 pts.	▲17364000 pts.
1876	37130100 pts.	13828000 pts.	▲23302100 pts.
1881	50597300 pts.	20248800 pts.	▲30348500 pts.
1886	52676100 pts.	21510000 pts.	▲31166100 pts.
1894	57966400 pts.	20788100 pts.	▲37691400 pts.
1902	94768500 pts.	38230600 pts.	▲56537900 pts.
1907	110726400 pts.	50448600 pts.	▲60277800 pts.
1917	151328000 pts.	82476000 pts.	▲68852000 pts.
1921	250828000 pts.	210467700 pts.	▲40360300 pts.
1928	301285300 pts.	216765500 pts.	▲84519800 pts.
1935	265578100 pts.	221144100 pts.	▲44433800 pts.

This table shows how the state supported railway companies by giving capital contributions as per the Decree-Law of July 12, 1924 or the Railway Statute of 1924. These contributions were given from 1926 to 1931 until the Republican governments withdrew the aid by denying the validity of this measure.

Year	State capital contributions
1926	29100000 pts.
1927	82400000 pts.
1928	81400000 pts.
1929	109500000 pts.
1930	83400000 pts.
1931	6700000 pts.

== Owned railroad lines ==
=== Chronology of constructed lines ===
First sections to start operating

Concession	Date	Section	Length (km)
Madrid-Almansa-Alicante	November 17, 1857	Albacete-Almansa	79,5
.	March 15, 1858	Almansa-Alicante	96,5
Madrid-Zaragoza	May 3, 1859	Madrid-Guadalajara	56,8
.	October 5, 1860	Guadalajara-Jadraque	43,3
.	October 1, 1861	Zaragoza-Casetas	13,1
.	July 2, 1862	Jadraque-Medinaceli	61,7
.	February 4, 1863	Medinaceli-Alhama	53,3
.	May 25, 1863	Alhama-Grisén	96,2
.	August 10, 1864	Grisén-Casetas	13,1
.	October 1, 1864	Casetas-Zaragoza (Campo Sepulcro)	13,0
Alcázar-Ciudad Real	July 1, 1860	Alcázar-Manzanares	49,2
.	October 1, 1860	Manzanares-Daimiel	21,4
.	January 21, 1861	Daimiel-Almagro	21,3
.	March 14, 1861	Almagro-Ciudad Real	22,2
Albacete-Cartagena	February 1, 1863	Murcia-Cartagena	65,1
.	January 18, 1864	Chinchilla-Hellin	49,7
.	October 8, 1864	Cieza-Murcia	49,3
.	October 8, 1864	Hellin-Agramón	19,6
.	March 9, 1865	Albacete-Chinchilla	19,1
.	March 27, 1865	Cieza-Calasparra	24,9
.	April 27, 1865	Agramón-Calasparra	17,8
.	May 2, 1891	Cartagena-Muelles del Levante	0,7
.	May 2, 1892	Costa Levante-Puerto Cartagena	0,7

=== Lines under operation ===
Line	Length	Acquisition	Start-up company	Inauguration	Notes
Madrid - Almansa - Alicante	176 km	1856		1861	Built by MZA
Madrid - Zaragoza	350,5 km	1856		1865	Built by MZA
Castillejo - Toledo	26,2 km	1858	Compañía del Ferrocarril de Castillejo a Toledo	1858	
Alcázar de San Juan - Ciudad Real	134 km	1859		1861	Built by MZA
Albacete - Cartagena	245,5 km	1863		1865	Built by MZA
Manzanares - Córdoba		1860			Built by MZA
Córdoba - Seville	132 km	1859	Compañía del Ferrocarril de Córdoba a Sevilla	1875	
Seville - Huelva	111 km	1877	Compañía del Ferrocarril de Sevilla a Huelva	1880	MZA only acquired the rights to the line and had to undertake its construction.
Ciudad Real - Badajoz	324 km	1866	Compañía de los Caminos de Hierro de Ciudad Real a Badajoz	1880	
Almorchón - Belmez	63,7 km	1868	Compañía de los Caminos de Hierro de Ciudad Real a Badajoz	1880	
Madrid - Ciudad Real	170,3 km	1879	Compañía de los Caminos de Hierro de Ciudad Real a Badajoz	1880	
Mérida - Seville		1880	Compañía del Ferrocarril de Mérida a Sevilla	1885	MZA only acquired the rights to the line and had to undertake its construction.
Aranjuez - Cuenca		1880		1885	MZA only acquired the rights to the line and had to undertake its construction.
Ariza - Valladolid	254 km	1892	Compañía del Ferrocarril del Duero	1895	MZA only acquired the rights to the line and had to undertake its construction.
Barcelona - Granollers - Empalme		1898	Compañía de los ferrocarriles de Tarragona a Barcelona y Francia (TBF)	1861	Built by Camino de Hierro del Norte.
Barcelona - Mataró - Empalme		1898	TBF	1848	Built by Camino de Hierro de Barcelona a Mataró.
Empalme - Girona		1898	TBF	1862	Built by Caminos de Hierro de Barcelona a Gerona.
Girona - Portbou		1878	TBF (Built by the company)	1898	
Barcelona - Martorell - Tarragona			TBF	1898	
Valls - Villanueva - Barcelona			TBF	1898	
Roda de Bará - Reus - Caspe		1894	Compañía de los Ferrocarriles Directos de Madrid y Zaragoza a Barcelona and TBF (Built by the company)	1898	

== MZA motor pool ==
=== Steam locomotives ===
Type	Procedure	MZA (I) No.	MZA (II) No.	Renfe No.	Manufacturer	Factory No.	Year	Weight (t)	Note
120	MA	1	.	.	Stothert, Slaughter & Co, Bristol	?	1851	19,0	.
111 T	MA	2 to 8	.	.	Stothert, Slaughter & Co, Bristol	?	1852	17,0	.
120 T	MA	9 a 10	.	.	Stothert, Slaughter & Co, Bristol	?	1855	17,0	.
120	MA	11 to 16	.	.	Stothert, Slaughter & Co, Bristol	?	1850	19,0	.
120	MA	17 to 20	.	.	Saint-Léonard, Liège	49-52	1848	19,0	.
021	MA/CT	41 to 44	.	.	Stothert, Slaughter & Co, Bristol	?	1858	26,0	.
120	.	119 to 123	45 to 49	.	Kitson, Leeds	655-659	1858	29,5	.
120	.	124 to 128	50 to 54	.	Kitson, Leeds	665-669	1859	29,5	.
120	.	139 to 143	55 to 59	.	Sharp-Stewart, Manchester	1186-1190	1861	27,9	.
120	.	144 to 146	60 to 62	.	Sharp-Stewart, Manchester	1212-1214	1861	27,9	.
120	.	129 to 138	63 to 72	120-2011	Schneider & Cie., Le Creusot	410-419	1858	24,9	.
120	.	.	73 to 82	.	Schneider & Cie., Le Creusot	641-650	1861	24,9	.
120	.	.	83 to 88	.	Schneider & Cie., Le Creusot	663-668	1862	24,9	.
120	.	.	89 to 107	120-2012 to 2014	Charles Evrard, Brussels	18-36	1861	24,9	.
120	.	.	108 to 113	120-2015	Charles Evrard, Brussels	41, 43-47	1861	24,9	109-111 and 113 sold to Cordoba-Malaga (1863)
120	.	.	114 to 118	120-2016	Charles Evrard, Brussels	51-55	1861	24,9	.
120	.	.	119 to 128	120-2017	Ernest Goüin, París	618-627	1863	24,9	.
120	CS	.	129 to 130	.	Stephenson, Newcastle	1035-1036	1857	?	.
120	CS	.	131 to 142	.	Schneider & Cie., Le Creusot	321-332	1857	27,6	.
120	MS	.	143 to 148	120-2071 to 2072	John Cockerill, Seraing	995-1000	1879	29,6	.
120	TBF	.	149-150	120-2121 to 2122	MTM, Barcelona	9-10	1895	40,3	.
120	TBF	.	151-154	120-2101 to 2103	Sharp-Stewart, Manchester	3388-3391	1887	34,9	.
120	TBF	.	155-158	120-2104 to 2106	Sharp-Stewart, Manchester	3415-3418	1887	34,9	.
120	TBF	.	159 to 162	120-2107 to 2109	Sharp-Stewart, Manchester	3506-3509	1889	34,9	.
120	TBF	.	163 to 166	120-2110 to 2111	Sharp-Stewart, Manchester	3637-3640	1889	34,9	.
120	TBF	.	167	.	Sharp-Stewart, Manchester	771	1854	28,0	.
120	TBF	.	168	030-2112	Sharp-Stewart, Manchester	774	1854	28,0	Rebuilt at 120 T about 1913
120	TBF	.	169 to 172	.	Sharp-Stewart, Manchester	1401-1404	1863	26,8	.
120	TBF	.	173	.	Sharp-Stewart, Manchester	1419	1863	26,8	.
120	TBF	.	174	.	Sharp-Stewart, Manchester	1424	1863	26,8	.
120	TBF	.	175	.	Sharp-Stewart, Manchester	1466	1863	26,8	.
120 T	TBF	.	176 to 181	120-0201 to 0204	Sharp-Stewart, Manchester	2708-2713	1877	41,5	.
120	TBF	.	182 to 184	.	Sharp-Stewart, Manchester	1491-1492, 1494	1864	30,1	.
021	TBF	.	185 to 188	.	Sharp-Stewart, Manchester	1229-1232	1861	31,7	.
021	TBF	.	189 to 196	021-2011 to 2012	Sharp-Stewart, Manchester	2684-2691	1879	29,1	.
021	TBF	.	197 to 200	.	Sharp-Stewart, Manchester	2863-2866	1879	29,1	.
030	.	.	201 to 210	030-2261 to 2270	Schneider & Cie., Le Creusot	560-569	1860	30,3	.
030	.	.	211 to 221	030-2271 to 2281	Schneider & Cie., Le Creusot	594-604	1860	30,3	.
030	.	.	222 to 236	030-2282 to 2294	Schneider & Cie., Le Creusot	702-716	1862	30,3	.
030	.	.	237 to 238	030-2295 to 2296	Graffenstaden	192-193	1862	27,9	.
030	.	.	239 to 240	030-2297 to 2298	Graffenstaden	299-300	1864	27,9	.
030	.	.	241 to 245	030-2299 to 2303	Graffenstaden	196-200	1862	27,9	.
030	.	79	246	030-2013	E.B. Wilson & Co., Leeds	607	1857	24,7	.
030	.	80	247	.	E.B. Wilson & Co., Leeds	608	1857	24,7	.
030	.	86 to 98	248 to 265	030-2014 to 2027	E.B. Wilson & Co., Leeds	609-626	1857	24,7	.
030	.	99 to 103	266 to 270	030-2028 to 2031	Kitson, Leeds	599-603	1857	24,7	.
030	.	104 to 108	271 to 275	030-2032	Kitson, Leeds	609-613	1857	24,7	.
030	.	109 to 113	276 to 280	030-2033 to 2036	Kitson, Leeds	625-629	1857	24,7	.
030	.	114 to 118	281 to 285	030-2037 to 2040	Kitson, Leeds	645-649	1857	24,7	.
030	.	49 to 58	286 to 295	030-2041 to 2047	J.F. Cail & Cie., París	624-633	1857	24,7	.
030	.	59 to 68	296 to 305	030-2048 to 2053	J.F. Cail & Cie., París	634-643	1858	24,7	.
030	.	69 to 78	306 to 315	030-2054 to 2059	J.F. Cail & Cie., París	661-670	1858	24,7	.
030	.	151	316	.	John Cockerill, Seraing	511	1860	24,7	.
030	MA	11 to 12	317 to 318	.	Stothert, Slaugther and Company, Bristol	?	1856	?	.
030	MA	43 to 48	319 to 324	.	Slaugther-Grünning, Bristol	343-348	1858	?	.
030	TBF	.	317 to 320 (II)	030-2116 to 2119	Avonside Engine Company, Bristol	750-753	1868	39,4	.
030	TBF	.	321 to 324 (II)	030-2120 to 2123	Avonside Engine Company, Bristol	843-846	1871	39,4	.
030	.	.	325 to 326	030-2304 to 2305	Graffenstaden	289-290	1862	27,9	.
030	.	.	327 to 330	.	Graffenstaden	291-294	1863	27,9	Sold to Portugal
030	.	.	331 to 334	030-2306 to 2309	Graffenstaden	325-328	1864	27,9	.
030	.	.	335 to 342	030-2310 to 2317	Schneider & Cie., Le Creusot	779-786	1863	32,3	.
030	.	.	343 to 359	030-2318 to 2334	Schneider & Cie., Le Creusot	801-816	1863	32,3	.
030	.	.	360 to 364	030-2335 to 2339	Schneider & Cie., Le Creusot	830-834	1865	32,3	Sold to the ZPB (1872); They returned to MZA in 1880.
030	.	.	365 a 369	.	Schneider & Cie., Le Creusot	835-839	1865	32,3	Transferred to Cordoba-Malaga (1865).
030	CS	.	370 to 373	.	Haswell, Vienna	689-692	1863	27,9	Ceded to Norte
030	.	.	374 to 387	030-2340 to 2353	SACM, Graffenstaden	2810-2823	1879	32,0	.
030	.	.	388 to 399	030-2354 to 2365	Sharp-Stewart, Manchester	2822-2833	1879	32,0	.
030	CRB	.	401 to 406	030-2209 to 2214	Fives-Lille	2232-2237	1878	34,8	.
030	CRB	.	407 to 414	030-2215 to 2222	Fives-Lille	2271-2278	1880	34,8	.
030	.	.	415 to 434	030-2231 to 2250	Franco-Belge, La Croyère	427-446	1883	36,4	.
030	AC	.	435 to 441	030-2479 to 2485	Hartmann, Chemnitz	1244-1250	1883	36,1	.
030	AC	.	442 to 446	030-2388 to 2392	Dübs, Glasgow	1555-1559	1881	38,2	.
030	TBF	.	447 to 448	.	André Koechlin & Cie., Mulhouse	?	1870	?	.
130	TBF	.	449 to 451	.	Rogers Locomotive and Machine Works	3462-3464	1883	39,0	.
130	TBF	.	452	.	Rogers Locomotive and Machine Works	2707	1880	38,1	.
030	TBF	.	453	.	Rogers Locomotive and Machine Works	2689	1880	38,1	.
030	TBF	.	454 to 465	030-2577 to 2588	Hartmann, Chemnitz	1204-1215	1882	34,4	.
030	TBF	.	466 to 477	030-2589 to 2600	Hartmann, Chemnitz	1280-1291	1883	34,4	.
030	TBF	.	478 to 481	030-2601 to 2604	Hartmann, Chemnitz	1473-1476	1886	34,4	.
030	TBF	.	482 to 485	030-2605 to 2608	Hartmann, Chemnitz	1683-1686	1890	34,4	.
040	CRB	.	501 to 516	040-2031 to 2036	J.F. Cail & Cie., París	1268-1273	1863	39,0	.
040	CRB	.	507 to 511	040-2037 to 2041	J.F. Cail & Cie., París	1276-1281	1863	39,0	.
040	CRB	.	512 to 516	.	J.F. Cail & Cie., París	1281-1285	1864	39,0	Sold to Andaluces
040	CRB	.	517 to 522	.	J.F. Cail & Cie., París	1374-1379	1865	39,0	Sold to Andaluces
040	CRB	.	523 to 526	.	J.F. Cail & Cie., París	1380-1383	1865	39,0	Sold to ZPB
040	CRB	.	527 to 536	040-2042 to 2052	Schneider & Cie., Le Creusot	907-916	1865	39,0	.
040	MS	.	537 to 546	040-2061 to 2072	John Cockerill, Seraing	1001-1010	1878	39,9	.
040	.	.	547 to 561	040-2271 to 2285	MTM, Barcelona	18-32	1900	43,0	.
040	TBF	.	562 to 566	040-2011 to 2015	Sharp-Stewart, Manchester	2779-2783	1879	42,8	.
040	TBF	.	567	.	Sharp-Stewart, Manchester	2784	1879	42,8	.
040	TBF	.	568 to 571	040-2016 to 2019	Sharp-Stewart, Manchester	2851-2854	1879	42,8	.
040	TBF	.	572 to 575	040-2020 to 2023	Sharp-Stewart, Manchester	2896-2899	1879	42,8	.
040	TBF	.	576 to 583	040-2301 to 2308	Sharp-Stewart, Manchester	3520-3527	1889	44,7	.
020 T	.	.	601 to 610	020-0231 to 0240	Couillet	786-795	1885	19,0	.
020 T	TBF	.	611	020-0211	Anjubault, París	103	1864	22,0	.
020 T	TBF	.	612	020-0212	Anjubault, París	105	1865	22,0	.
030 ST	TBF	.	613	.	(English?)	?	?	?	.
232 T	.	.	620 to 631	232-0201 to 0212	J.A. Maffeï, Munich	2339-2350	1903	58,9	.
232 T	.	.	632 to 641	232-0213 to 0220	J.A. Maffeï, Munich	3260-3269	1911	58,9	.
230	.	.	651 to 665	230-4001 to 4015	G. Egestorff, Hanover	3654-3668	1901	55,5	.
230	.	.	666 to 680	230-4016 to 4030	Henschel, Cassel	6308-6322	1903	55,5	.
040	.	.	741 to 746	040-2401 to 2406	Henschel, Cassel	8363-8388	1907	51,0	.
231	.	.	901 to 911	231-2011 to 2021	ALCO, Brooks	61772-61782	1920	76,6	.
231	.	.	912	.	ALCO, Brooks	61783	1920	76,6	.
231	.	.	913 to 915	231-2022 to 2024	ALCO, Brooks	61784-61786	1920	76,6	.
240	.	.	1301 to 1307	240-4051 to 4057	Hanomag, Hanover	6484-6490	1914	79,0	.
240	.	.	1308	240-4058	Hanomag, Hanover	6991	1920	79,0	.
240	.	.	1536 to 1565	240-2396 to 2425	MTM, Barcelona	438-467	1930	82,5	.
242 T	.	.	1601 to 1625	242-0231 to 0255	MTM, Barcelona	154-178	1924	92,5	.
242 T	.	.	1626 to 1650	242-0256 to 0280	MTM, Barcelona	220-244	1926	86,7	.
242 T	.	.	1651 to 1660	242-0281 to 0290	MTM, Barcelona	325-334	1927	87,4	.
241	.	.	1701 to 1725	241-2001 to 2025	MTM, Barcelona	179-203	1925	92,6	.
241	.	.	1726 to 1765	241-2026 to 2065	MTM, Barcelona	284-323	1927	93,2	.
241	.	.	1766 to 1775	241-2066 to 2075	MTM, Barcelona	380-389	1929	94,6	.
241	.	.	1776 to 1785	241-2076 to 2085	MTM, Barcelona	428-437	1930	94,5	.
241	.	.	1786 to 1795	241-2086 to 2095	MTM, Barcelona	468-477	1931	96,5	.
241	.	.	1801 to 1810	241-2101 to 2110	MTM, Barcelona	499-508	1939	107,5	.
240	.	.	2401 to 2425	240-2481 to 2505	MTM, Barcelona	519-543	1942	96,6	.
240	.	.	2426 to 2445	240-2506 to 2525	Euskalduna, Bilbao	240-259	1943	96,6	.
240	.	.	2446 to 2460	240-2526 to 2540	MTM, Barcelona	559-573	1943	96,6	.
240	.	.	2466 to 2475	240-2451 to 2550	MTM, Barcelona	549-558	1943	96,6	.
240	.	.	2481 to 2499	240-2551 to 2569	Babcock & Wilcox, Bilbao	552-570	1951	96,6	.
241	.	.	2701 to 2722	240-2201 to 2222	MTM, Barcelona	594-615	1944	120,0	.

=== Thermal railcars ===
Type	MZA No.	Renfe No.	Manufacturer	Factory No.	Year	Engine	Power	Weight	Note
AA GM	WM 101 to 104	9151 to 9154	Carde y Escoriaza, Zaragoza	?	1937	Renault	110 cv	t?	Renault license, type "ZO".
BoBo DE	WE 201 to 204	9200 to 9202	MTM, Barcelona	?	1936	Burmeister & Wain, Copenhague, type 613,5 VL 22	250 cv	t?	.
BoBo DM	WM 226 to 227	9204 to 9205	MMC, Zaragoza	59-60	1936	Renault type 517	265 cv	t?	Renault license. Type "ABJ 2".
BoBo DM	WM 228 to 231	9300 to 9303	MMC, Zaragoza	?	1936	Renault type 517	300 cv	t?	Renault license. Type "ABJ 2".
BoBo DE	WE 401 to 404	9403 to 9405	CAF, Beasain	?	1935	Maybach, Friedrichshafen, type GO.5	410 cv	t?	.

== See also ==
- Riotinto-Nerva mining basin
- Riotinto Railway
- Tharsis-La Zarza mining basin

== Bibliography ==
- Álvarez de Castrillón, Rafael Anes (1978). Ferrocarriles en España 1844-1943, Tomo 2: Economía y los ferrocarriles (in Spanish). Madrid: Servicio de Publicaciones del Banco de España.
- Artola, Miguel (1978). Ferrocarriles en España 1844-1943, Tomo 1: El estado y los ferrocarriles (in Spanish). Madrid: Servicio de Publicaciones del Banco de España.
- Fernández Sanz, Fernando; Reder, Gustavo (1995). Historia de la tracción vapor en España, Tomo 1, Locomotoras de MZA (in Spanish). Madrid. ISBN 84-920492-0-0.
- García de Cortázar, Fernando (2005). Atlas Historia de España (in Spanish). Barcelona: Círculo de Lectores. p. 555. ISBN 84-672-1436-8.
- Lentisco, David (2005). Cuando el hierro se hace camino, Historia del Ferrocarril en España (in Spanish). Madrid: Alianza Editorial.
- Maristany Gibert, Eduardo (1897). Puente sobre el río Martín en el kilómetro 6,373 de la línea de Val de Zafán a Gargallo (in Spanish). Vol. II. Revista de Obras Públicas. pp. 413–418. Archived from the original on 2013-12-03.
- Wais San Martín, Francisco (1974). Historia de los Ferrocarriles Españoles (in Spanish). Madrid: Editorial Española.
