= Cercanías Zaragoza =

Commuter rail network in Zaragoza metropolitan area

Cercanias Zaragoza

Overview
- Area served: Zaragoza, Utebo
- Locale: Centro, Portillo, Delicias, San José, Casetas, Utebo
- Transit type: Commuter rail
- Number of lines: 1+1 Proposed
- Number of stations: 6
- Annual ridership: 295,000
- Website: Cercanías Zaragoza

Operation
- Began operation: 11 June 2008; 18 years ago
- Operator: Renfe Operadora
- Infrastructure manager: Adif
- Character: Traditional track structure
- Number of vehicles: 2 (+1 backup)
- Train length: 3 cars
- Headway: 1 Hour

Technical
- System length: 16.6 km (10.3 mi)
- No. of tracks: 2
- Track gauge: 1,668 mm (5 ft 5 21/32 in) (Iberian gauge)
- Electrification: 3kV DC Catenary
- Top speed: 120 km/h (75 mph)

Cercanías Zaragoza is the name given to the Renfe operated commuter train service in and around the city of Zaragoza, in Aragon, Spain.

There is currently one line, the C-1 which it runs from Zaragoza-Miraflores station to Casetas. Trains run once an hour off-peak, with extra trains in rush hour. The second Cercanías line, along with extra stations on the original line, is being considered.

== Line C1 ==
The line C1 goes from Casetas to Miraflores, making four stops including the main station Zaragoza Delicias. It is the only line in the system.

- Casetas: the first station of the line. Casetas is a suburban neighborhood of Zaragoza, located at about 10 km from the city. The neighborhood has a population of about 15,000 inhabitants.

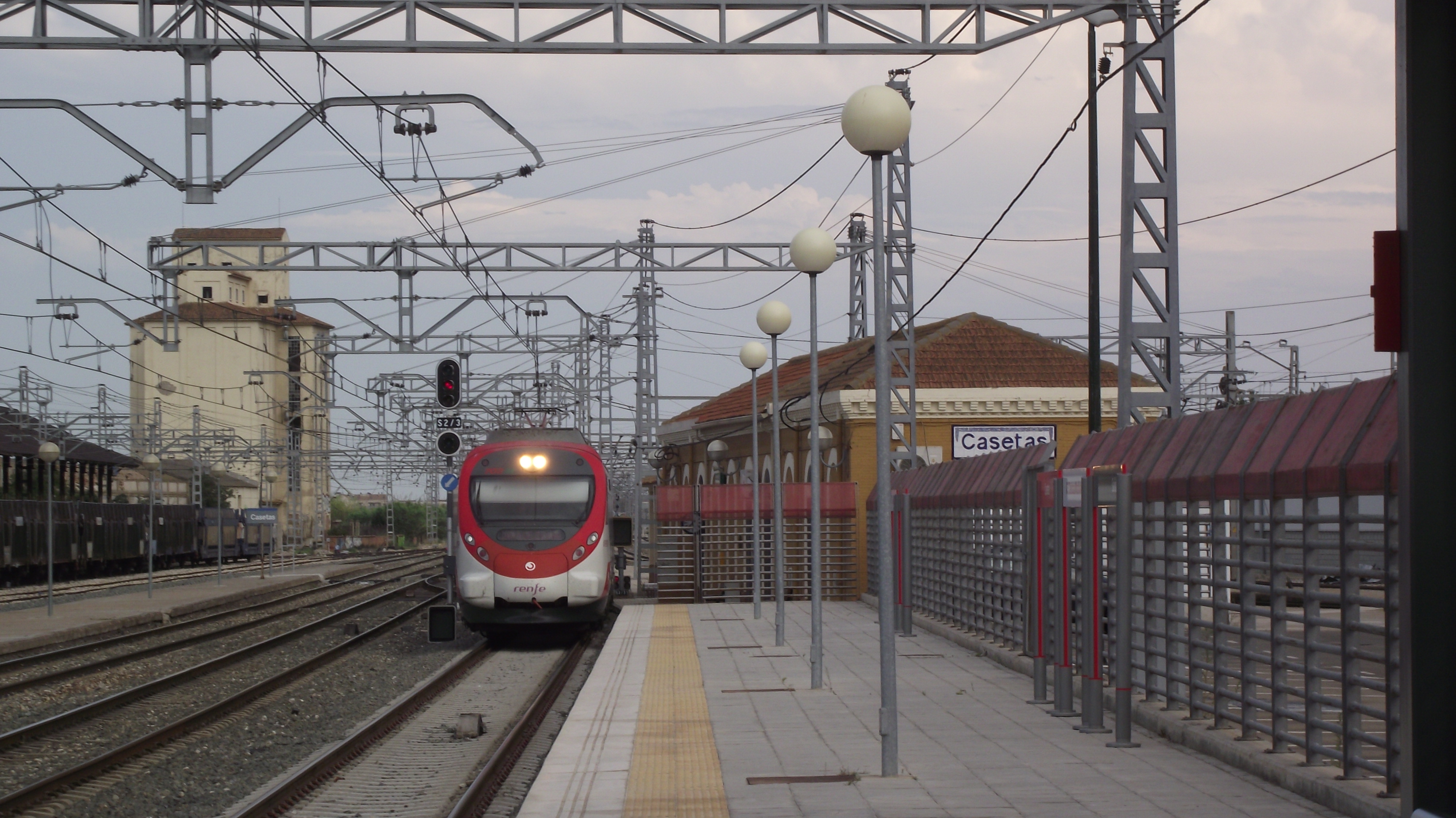
Train arriving at Casetas station

- Utebo: one of the most used stations in the line. The station, despite being small, is located in the center of the town of Utebo, a commuter town independent of the city.

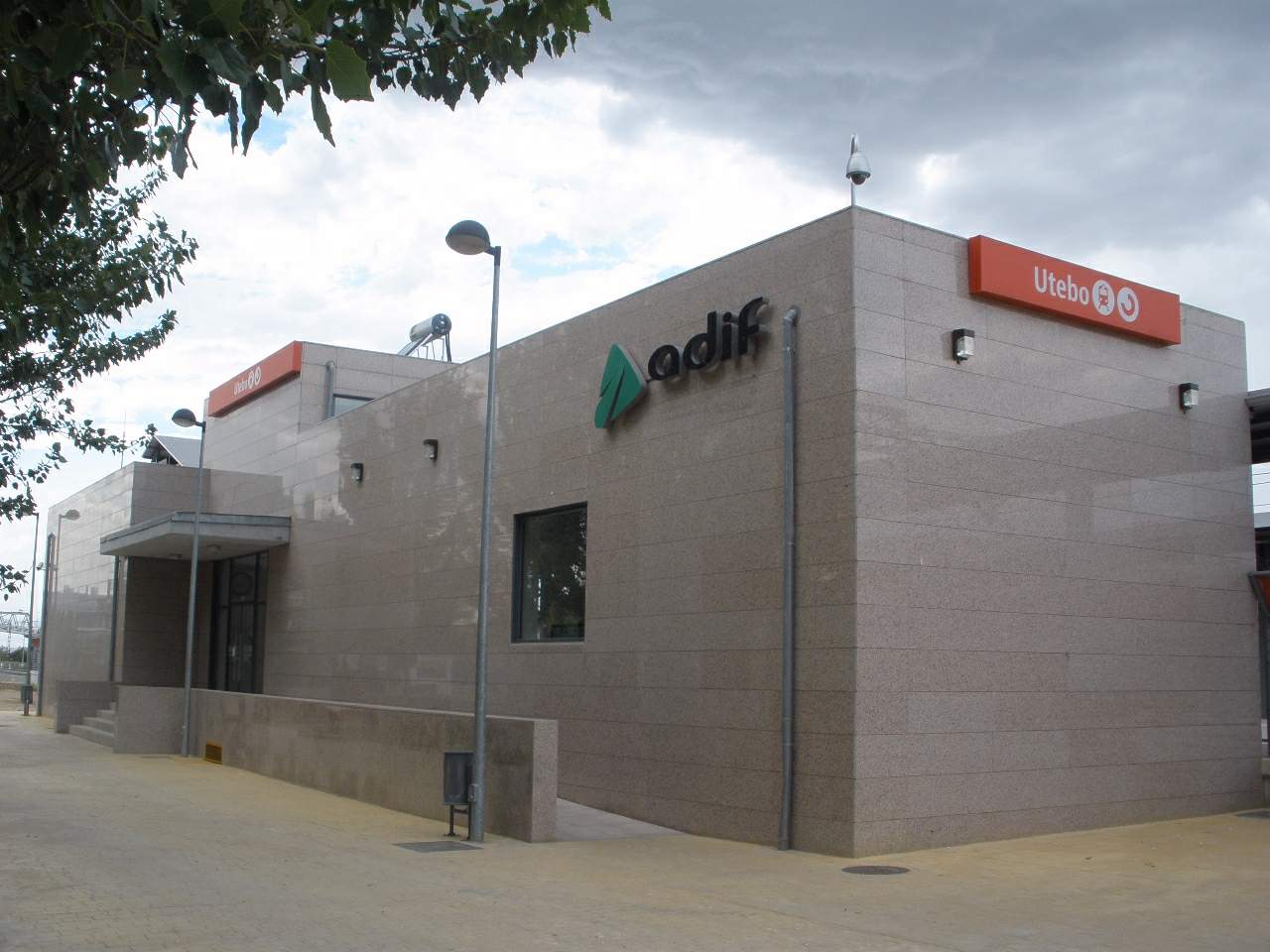
Utebo station

- Zaragoza-Delicias: the main railway station of the city, an important stop for long-distance and AVE (high-speed) trains. It is located in the most populated district of the city, Delicias.

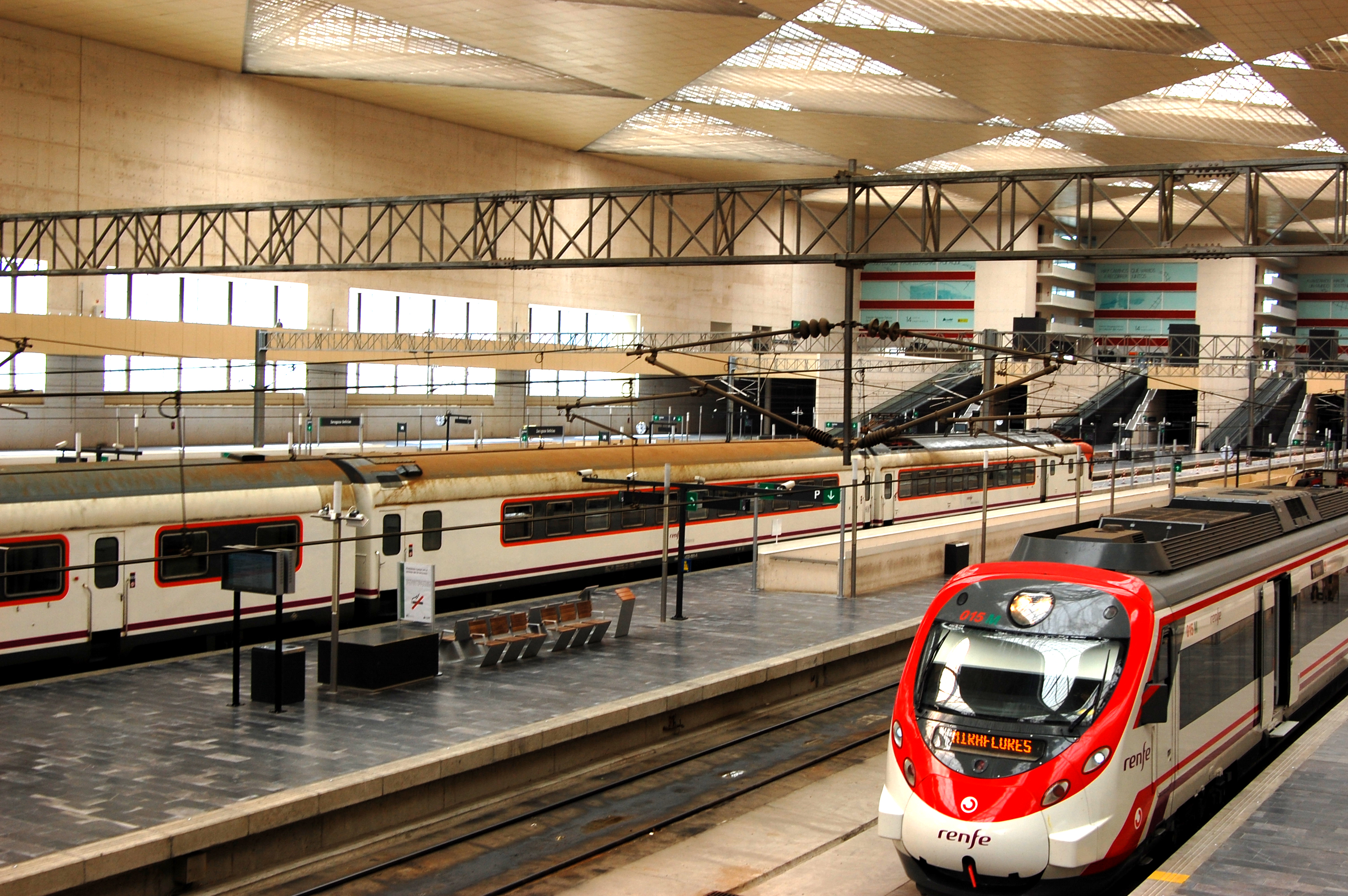
Cercanías train bound for Miraflores station at Zaragoza-Delicias

- Zaragoza-Portillo: the second stop in the city. Once the biggest and most important station in the city, nowadays it is located underground and has ground access. Some national trains also stop in this station.
- Zaragoza-Goya: the second most important station in the city and the most used in this line. Located in the center of the city, has connection to the tram system, which makes it easier for tourists to move around. Since it is an underground station too, there is a modern-style ground access in one of the most important avenues in Zaragoza.
- Miraflores: the last station of the line. It is located in the left side of the city, next to the Príncipe Felipe stadium.

== Frequency ==
The trains in this line run once an hour, but in peak hour, from 7 to 9:30am and from 17:00 to 18:30 the trains run every 30 minutes, with one train added to the line. Since the Zaragoza-Goya station was opened, regional trains passengers can go to the line C1.

== Statistics ==
Since 2012 the passenger number went up by 44%, specially because the Zaragoza-Goya station was opened and it has connections with the Zaragoza tram. That year, 343,000 people traveled on the line. The line has only 7.26% of occupancy, with the average being 23 passengers per train, being the least profitable city of the network.

== Line C2 ==
In 2017 the Aragonese government proposed a second line. It will go from the highway N-IIa to the Miguel Servet street and then it will branch to Compromiso de Caspe/c/Rodrigo Rebolledo and to the San Jose Avenue/Paseo del Canal. It will also be the tram line 2, a system like in Alicante.
