= Casetas =

Coordinates: 41.7189°N 1.0275°W

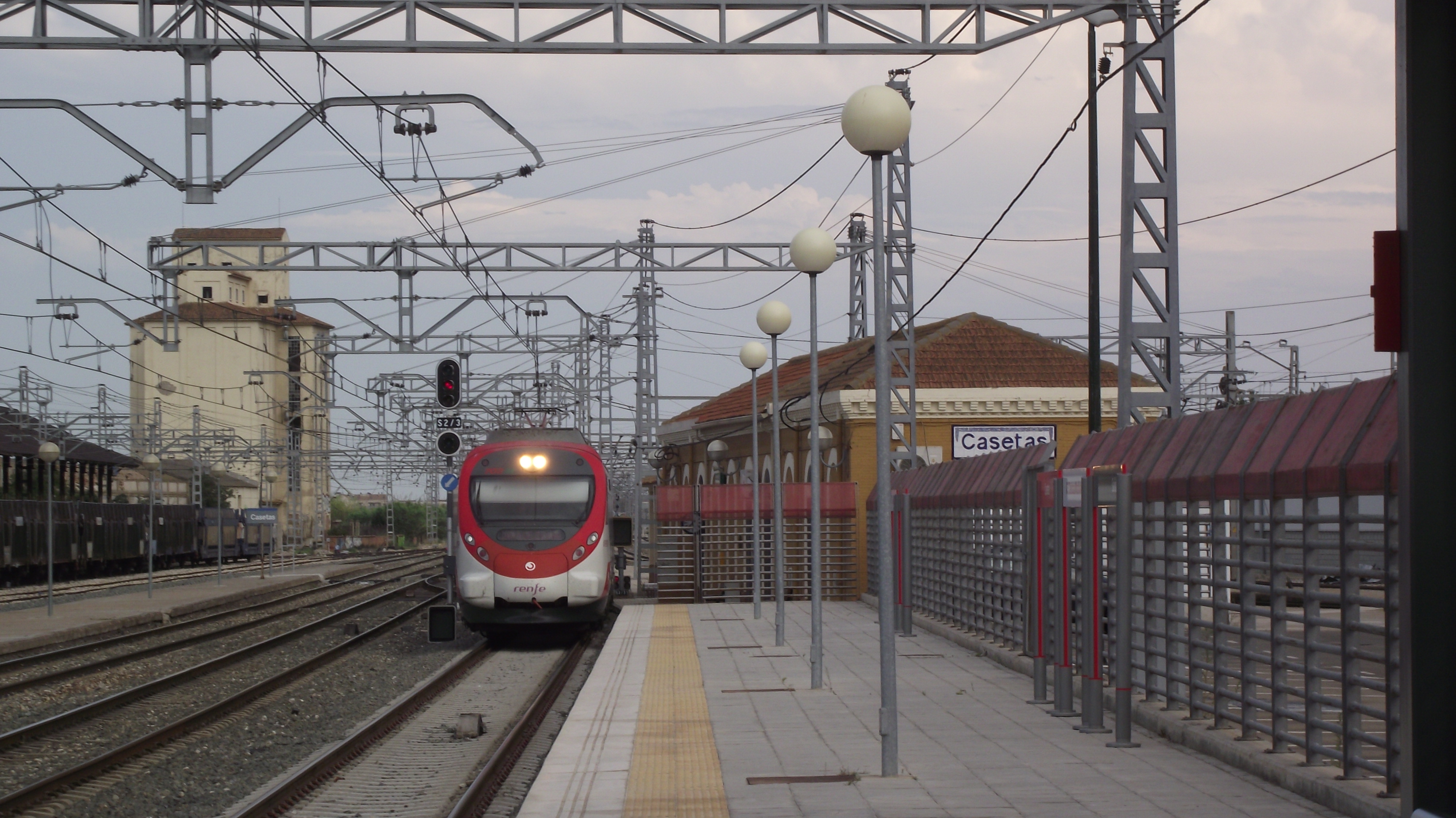
- Cercanías Zaragoza train (Civia) arriving in Casetas train station on the dedicated platform
- Interactive map of Casetas
- Country: Spain
- Autonomous community: Aragon
- Province: Zaragoza
- Municipality: Zaragoza

Government
  - Mayor: José Luis Román Escuer

Area
  - Total: 3.15 km^{2} (1.22 sq mi)
- Elevation: 215 m (705 ft)

Population (2010)
  - Total: 7,605
  - Density: 2,414.28/km^{2} (6,253.0/sq mi)
- Time zone: UTC+1 (CET)
  - Summer (DST): UTC+2 (CEST)
- ZIP code: 50180

Casetas is a borough of Zaragoza (Spain) located 15 km west of the city.

== Management ==
Casetas is a population entity that is 14 km (9 mi) from Zaragoza, its administrative capital. From July 1, 1879 by decision of the City Council of the former town of Las Casetas, this place began to be a neighborhood of the city of Zaragoza. Nowadays it is the most populated neighborhood of the 14 rural neighborhoods that the city has. Casetas is situated in the northwest corner of the municipality of Zaragoza, at 215 m (705 ft) of altitude, it borders Sobradiel on the north, Garrapinillos on the south, Utebo on the east and Pinseque, Alagón and La Joyosa on the west. The municipal term of Casetas has an area of 3.15 km^{2} (1.22 sq mi). The mayor of Casetas is Mr. José Luis Román Escuer.

== Demography ==
Casetas had a population of 7,605 inhabitants in 2010. The population of Casetas grew in the 20th century because of the construction of the railway train and the building of an Opel factory in the 1980s. Due to the arrival of foreign population, Casetas's population grew in the 21st century.

=== Demographic developments in the 18th and 19th centuries ===
1773	1796	1802	1816	1820	1823	1827	1843	1857	1860	1877	1887
68	78	99	81	123	130	150	110	268	309	361	721

=== Demographic developments in the 20th and 21st centuries ===
1900	1910	1920	1930	1940	1950	1960	1970	1981	1991	2001	2004	2005	2006	2007	2008	2009	2010
1,438	1,297	1,623	2,383	3,237	3,584	3,834	4,597	5,646	6,436	6,212	6,222	6,736	6,298	7,112	7,412	7,575	7,605

=== Foreign population by country of origin ===
Romania	Poland	Ecuador	Morocco	Portugal	Bulgaria
588	236	188	159	130	114

== Culture ==
Casetas has three schools, a high school, a day centre for the elderly, a youth club, a ludoteca, pools and a sports complex. Casetas has a long musical tradition, because many bands were formed there, like Pedro Botero, Se abre la veda, Zirrosis Kronica and La Cap Deleite.

== Festivities ==
- La Virgen de la Rosa (first Sunday of May)
- San Miguel (September 29)
