= Pinseque =

Coordinates: 41°44′N 1°06′W

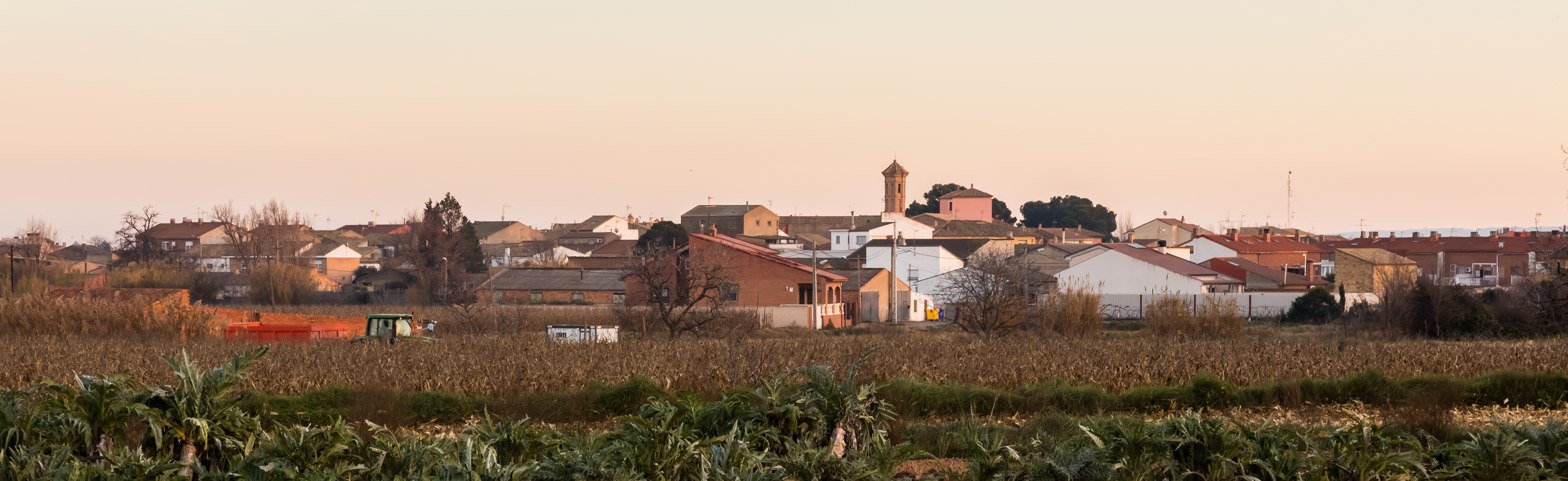

- Coat of arms
- Interactive map of Pinseque
- Country: Spain
- Autonomous community: Aragon
- Province: Zaragoza
- Municipality: Pinseque

Area
  - Total: 16.12 km^{2} (6.22 sq mi)
- Elevation: 230 m (750 ft)

Population (2025-01-01)
  - Total: 4,601
  - Density: 285.4/km^{2} (739.2/sq mi)
- Time zone: UTC+1 (CET)
  - Summer (DST): UTC+2 (CEST)
- Website: http://www.pinseque.es/

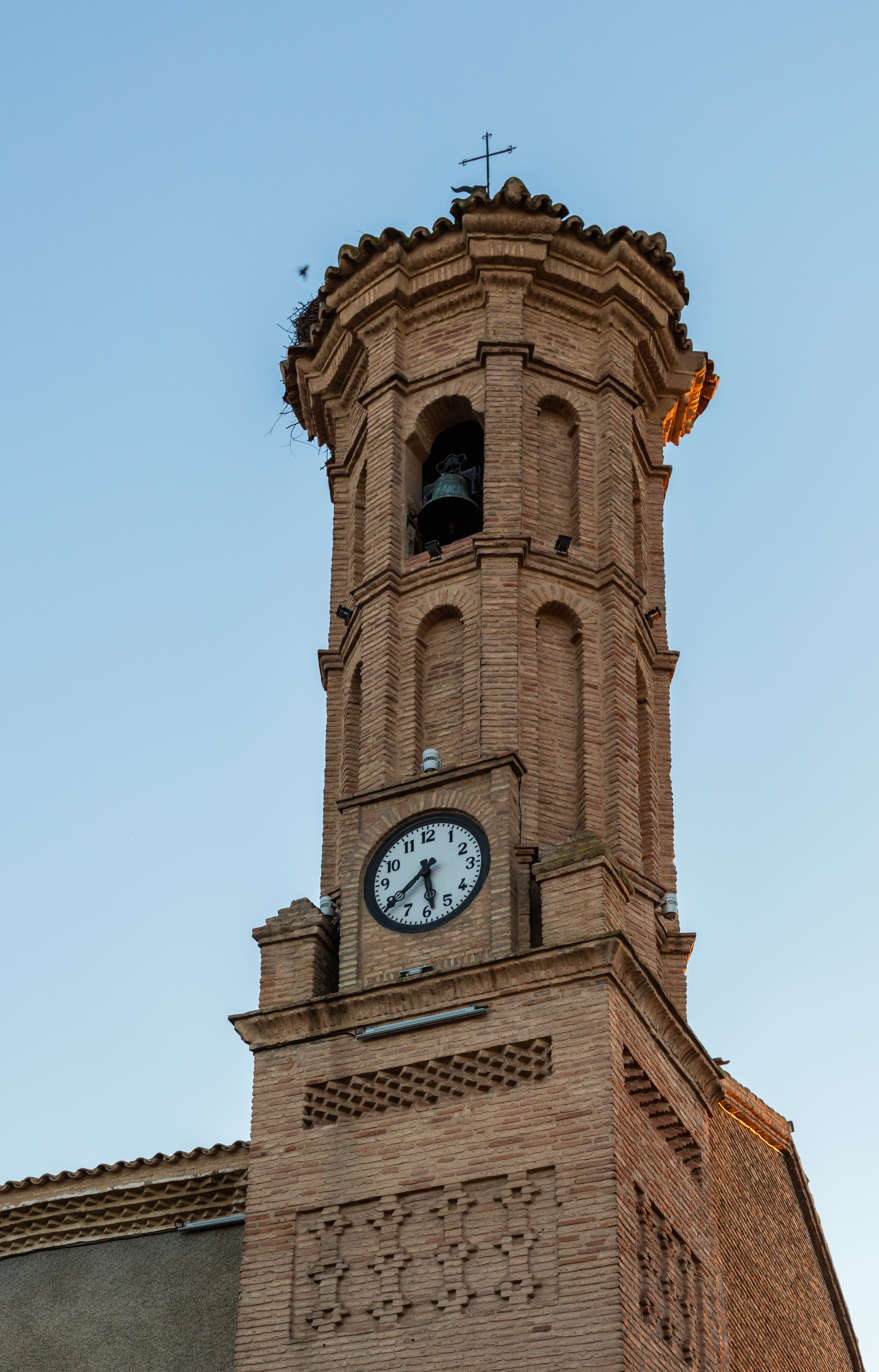
Bell tower of St Peter Martyr of Verona Church in Pînseque.

Pinseque is a municipality located in the province of Zaragoza, Aragon, Spain. According to the 2014 census (INE), the municipality has a population of 3,625 inhabitants, with a population density of 224.88 people per km² (582.4 per square mile).

== Facts ==
- The town is located 20 km (12.42 mi) from Zaragoza, the capital city of Aragon.
- Pinseque is 230 m (750 ft) above the sea level.
- The municipality's average temperature is 14 °C (57.2 °F).

== Politics ==
=== Election results ===
Party	2003	2007	2011	2015
PP	5	4	6	4
Podemos	-	-	-	0
PSOE	1	4	3	5
Ciudadanos	-	-	-	1
CHA	1	1	1	0
UPyD	0	0	1	1
PAR	2	2	-	0

There are only 11 councilors in the Pinseque's town hall.

== History ==
=== Town name ===
The town name of Pinseque comes from pin (pine) and sec (dry), probably because there were a pine forest here before its population. In Aragonese language, it is called Puysec - from puig (hill) and sec (dry). As the word dry is included in both Aragonese and Spanish language names, maybe the current town's area was considered very dry for crops or plant growing. When the Visigoths came to Spain, the village was called Pinsech.

== See also ==
- List of municipalities in Zaragoza
