= Zaragoza-Portillo railway station =

Railway station in Zaragoza, Spain

Zaragoza-Portillo
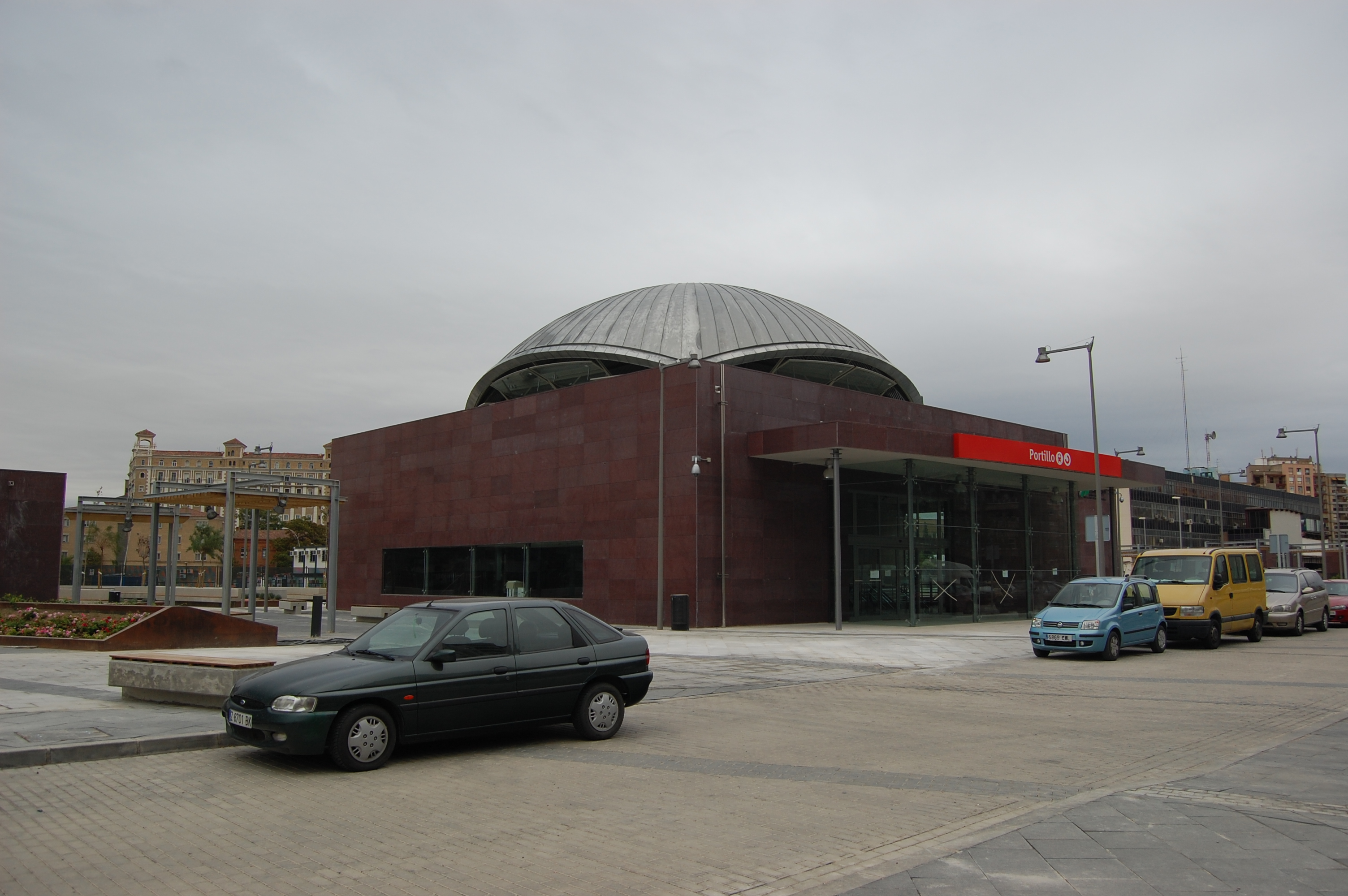
- Station building

General information
- Location: Spain
- Coordinates: 41.65274°N 0.89598°W
- Lines: Renfe; Cercanías Zaragoza: Madrid–Barcelona railway
- Tracks: 2

Construction
- Structure type: Underground
- Platform levels: 1
- Accessible: Yes

History
- Opened: 2008
Location

Zaragoza-Portillo is an underground railway station opened in 2008 in the Spanish city of Zaragoza, Aragon.

== History ==
The station is located on the site of the former Zaragoza-Campo Sepulcro station which opened in 1863 and renamed Zaragoza-Portillo in 1973. It was the city's main railway station prior to the opening of the Zaragoza–Delicias railway station in 2003.

== Services ==
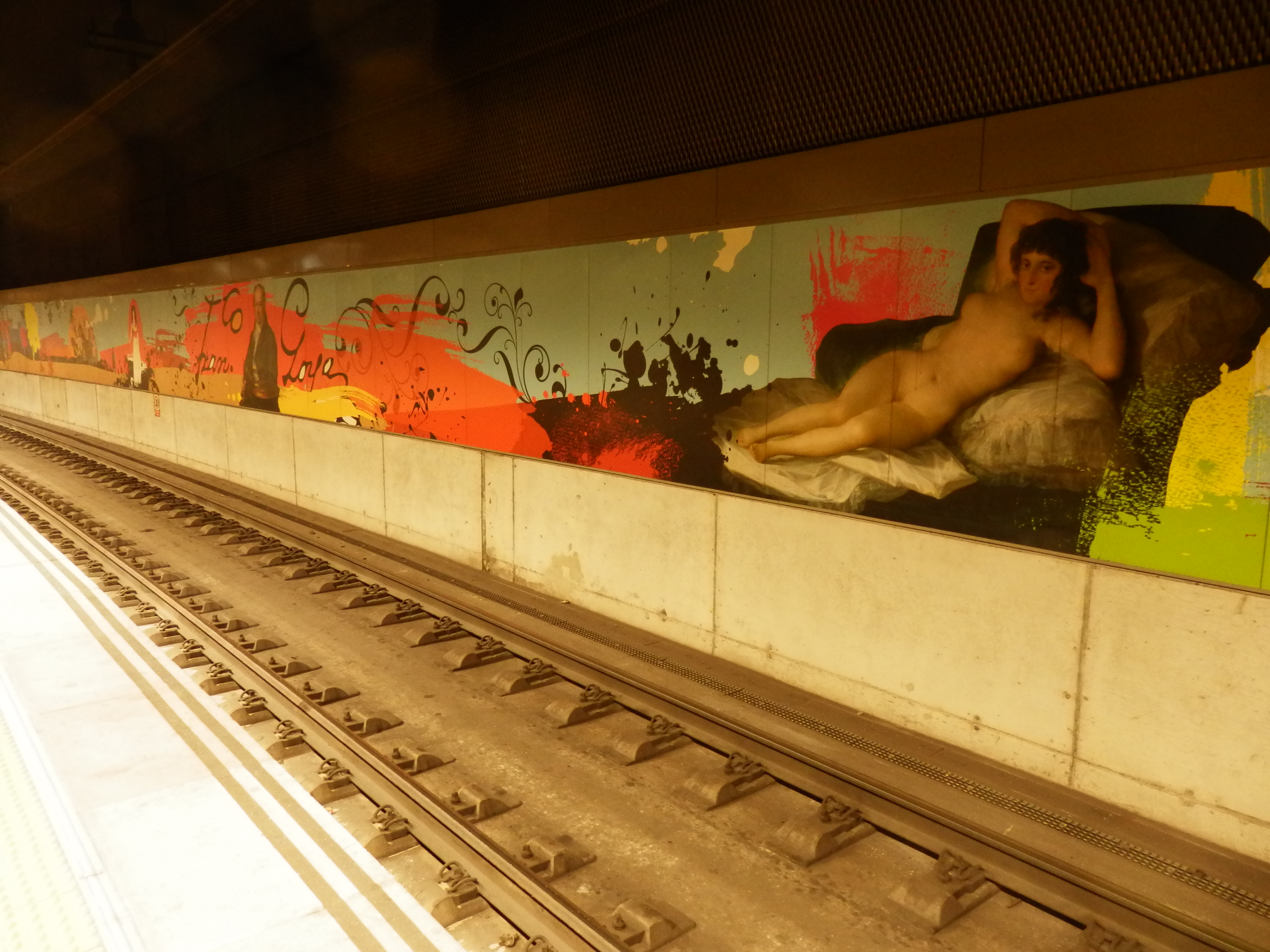
Underground platform

Zaragoza-Portillo is primarily served by the Cercanías Zaragoza commuter rail line, with a frequency of every 60 minutes. Regional services to Logroño and Canfranc via Huesca also call at Portillo.

Preceding station	Renfe Operadora	Following station
Zaragoza–Delicias towards Cartagena	Intercity	Zaragoza-Goya towards Miraflores
Zaragoza–Delicias towards Valencia Nord	Intercity	Zaragoza-Goya towards Miraflores
Zaragoza–Delicias Terminus	Media Distancia 34	Zaragoza-Goya towards Barcelona Sant Andreu Comtal
Zaragoza–Delicias towards Valencia Nord	Media Distancia 49	Zaragoza-Goya towards Huesca
Zaragoza–Delicias Terminus	Media Distancia 56	Zaragoza-Goya towards Jaca
Zaragoza–Delicias Terminus	Media Distancia 56	Zaragoza-Goya towards Canfranc
Preceding station	Cercanías Zaragoza	Following station
Zaragoza–Delicias towards Casetas	C-1	Zaragoza-Goya towards Miraflores
