= Sobradiel =

- municipality
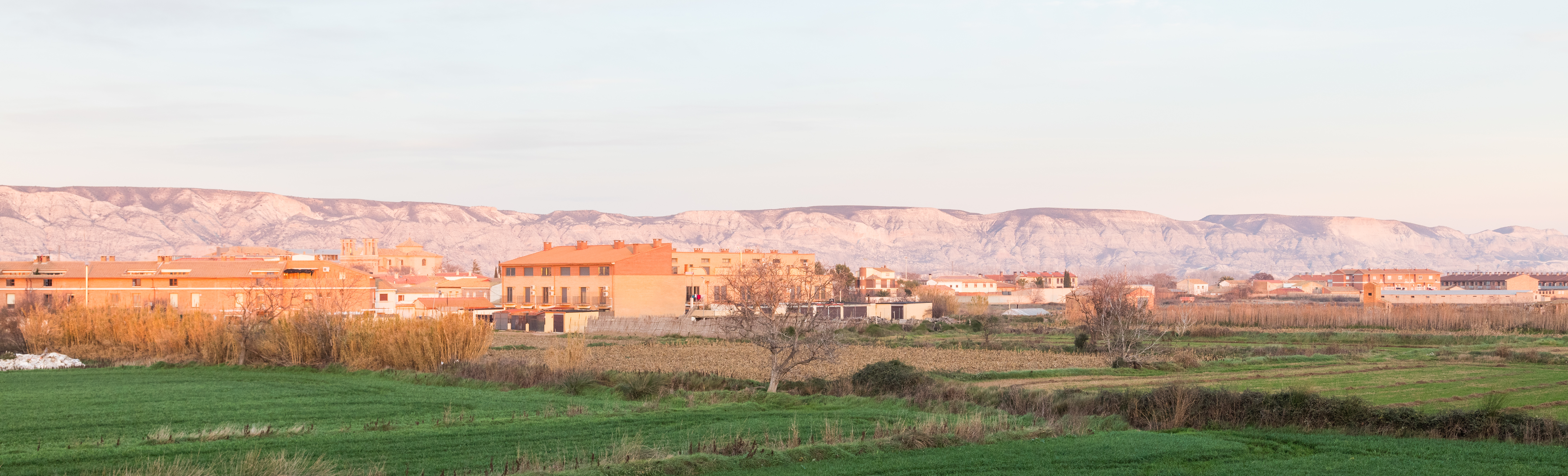
- View of Sobradiel

- Flag Coat of arms

- Location of Sobradiel within Aragon Location of Sobradiel within Spain
- Coordinates: 41°44′20″N 1°02′16″W
- Country: Spain
- Autonomous community: Aragon
- Province: Zaragoza

Area
  - Total: 11 km^{2} (4.2 sq mi)

Population (2025-01-01)
  - Total: 1,110
  - Density: 100/km^{2} (260/sq mi)
- Time zone: UTC+1 (CET)
  - Summer (DST): UTC+2 (CEST)

Sobradiel is a municipality located in the province of Zaragoza, Aragon, Spain. According to the 2004 census (INE), the municipality has a population of 752 inhabitants.

More information can be found in the official website www.sobradiel.es and in the unofficial community website www.sobradiel.org

== See also ==
- List of municipalities in Zaragoza
