= Zaragoza tram =

Tram system in Spain

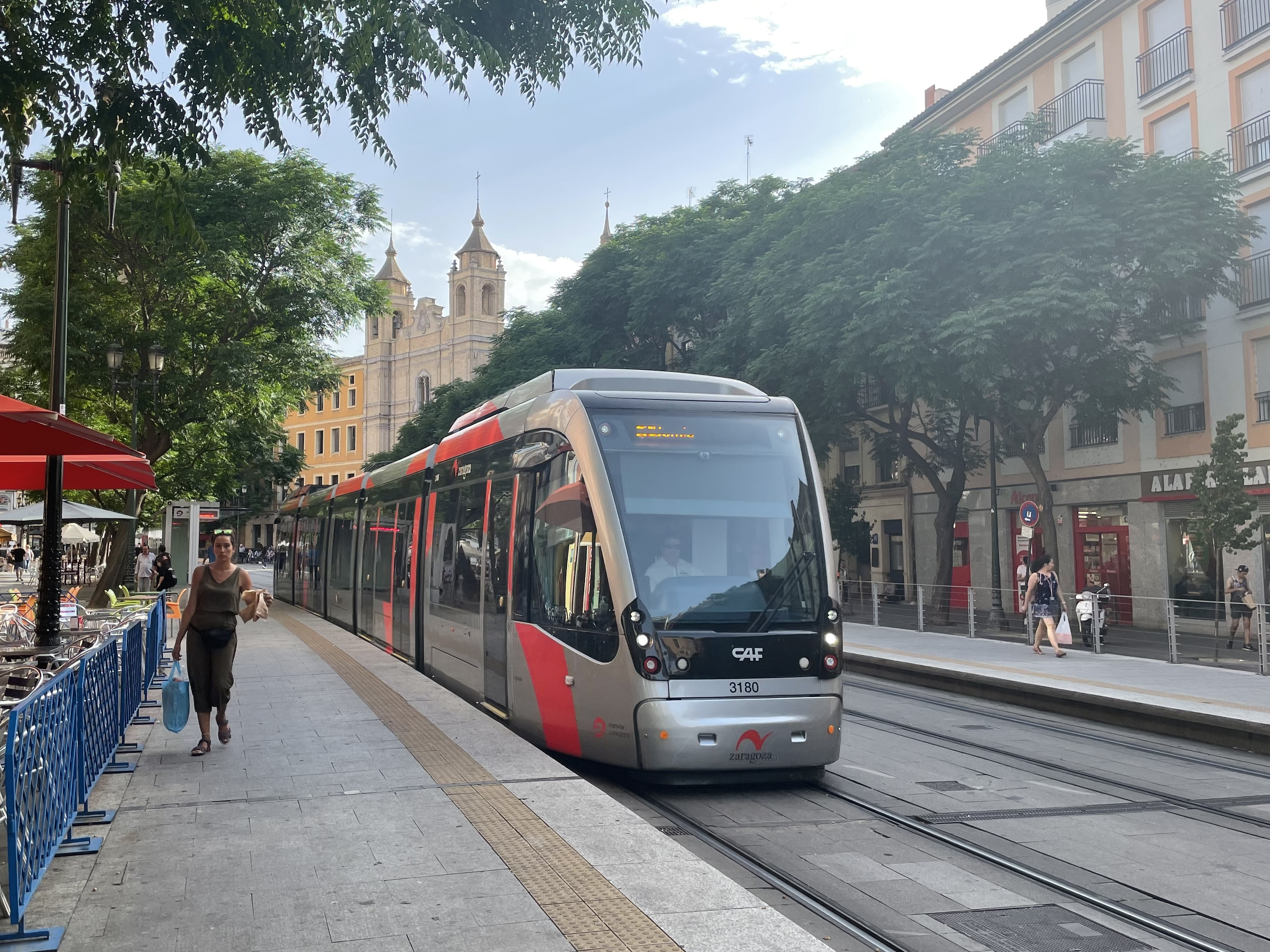

Overview
- Native name: Tranvía de Zaragoza
- Locale: Zaragoza, Aragón, Spain
- Transit type: Light rail
- Number of lines: 1
- Number of stations: 25
- Annual ridership: 27.8 million (2018)

Technical
- System length: 12.8 km (8.0 mi)
- Track gauge: 1,435 mm (4 ft 8 1/2 in) standard gauge

The Zaragoza Tram (Spanish: Tranvía de Zaragoza) is a tram system in the Spanish city of Zaragoza, capital of the autonomous community of Aragon. The first generation network ran from 1885 to 1976. The second generation has one line called Line 1 of which the first phase opened in 2011. The network was expected to be expanded with a second and third line but the project was cancelled but plans to recover it are being made.

== History ==
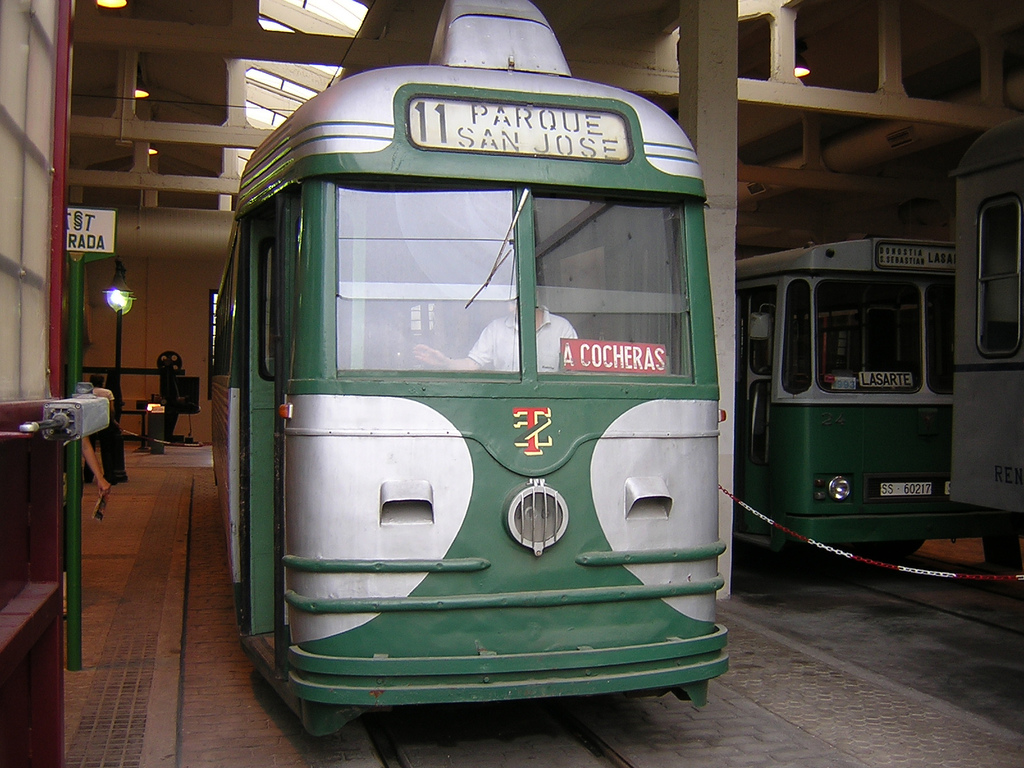
Old Zaragoza tram, #218, in the Basque Railway Museum.

In 1885, the first animal traction tram line was established. In 1902, Zaragoza had five main lines and one secondary line. In the same year, one of the lines were electrified. The network was expanding quickly in a radial form across the city, with the present Spain square as the center.

The 1950s was the heyday of the Zaragoza Tram. From the 1960s, the tram system declined, with little or no investment and was gradually converted to bus operation. On 23 January 1976, the last Zaragoza tram line (Parque-San José) disappeared and the company changed its name to Transportes Urbanos de Zaragoza (Urban Transport Company of Zaragoza).

In 1982 a report was published with plans to reinstall the tram as part of the premetro concept, along with alternative plans for a metro and monorail system.

On 10 June 2009, the Traza consortium of Tuzsa, CAF, FCC Construcción, Acciona, Ibercaja and Concessia selected to build new tramway. On 19 April 2011, Phase 1 of Line 1 opened. Phase 2 of the work of the new tram line 1 began for completion in mid-2013.

Two more lines are proposed:

- Line 2 (Las Fuentes-Delicias)
- Line 3 (La Jota-Torrero)

Green: line 1. Blue: lines for future expansion.

== Network ==
=== Line 1 (Valdespartera-Parque Goya) ===
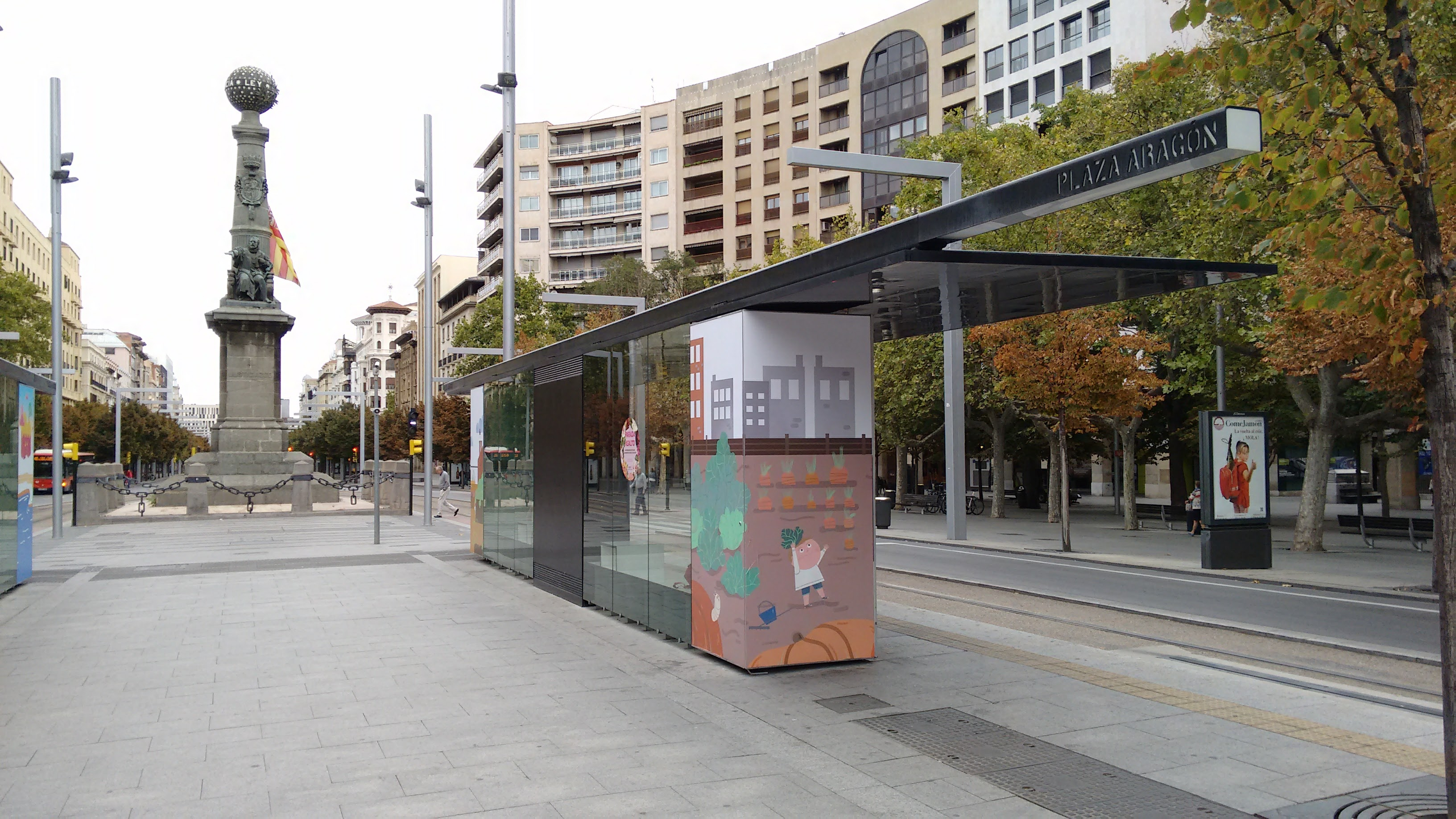
Stop of the new Zaragoza Tram

The initial north–south line has 25 stops with mostly side platforms except in two cases. The average distance between consecutive stops is about 500 m, adding to a total length of 12.8 km line. The average commercial speed is 19 km/h, with an end-to-end journey time of 40 minutes; 19 minutes for the journey Academia General Militar-Plaza de España (Spain Square) and 22 minutes from Plaza de España to Plaza Cinema Paradiso (Valdespartera).

Construction work started on August 18, 2009, and was projected to last four years in two phases:

- Phase 1 (2009–2011): Section between the Valdespartera neighbourhood and Plaza de Basilio Paraiso. Opened 19 April 2011.
- Phase 2: (2011–2013): Section between the Plaza de Basilio Paraiso and Academia General Militar.

The estimated investment is 400 million euros:

- Construction of the track and electrical system 202 million
- Purchase of rolling stock: 82 million
- Construction of the depot: 37 million
- Private investment due to works' enhancing "private" facilities: 55 million
- Traffic light system integration and other expenses: 25 million

The expected traffic in the project is around 100,000 passengers per day, with an average rate of 0.75 euros per passenger. In 2018, the line served 27.8 million passengers.

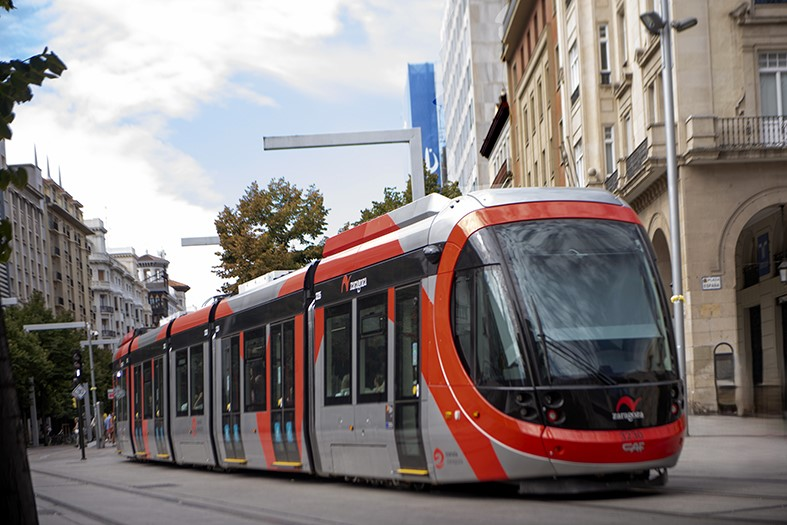
Second generation CAF tram.

== Rolling stock ==
The 21 CAF Urbos 3 trams are 33 m (108 ft 3 1/4 in) long, extendable to 43 m (141 ft 7/8 in), a width of 2.65 m (8 ft 8 3/8 in) and a height of 3.2 m (10 ft 6 in). They have a capacity of 200 people, 54 seated and 146 standing (at 3.5 persons per m^{2}).

== Electricity ==
The trams mostly use conventional catenary, but in the historical city centre (between Plaza Paraíso and the Roman wall) they use stored braking energy and, additionally, receive power during stops, thanks to the ACR system. Thus no overhead wires are present in the historic area.

== Future expansion ==
A second line is planned, utilising existing Cercanías Zaragoza track for tram train operation to Villanueva de Gállego.
