= Francisco Araujo =

Spanish futsal player and manager (born 1973)

Personal information
- Full name: Francisco Javier Araujo Fernández
- Date of birth: 17 May 1973 (age 53)
- Place of birth: Barcelona, Cataluña, Spain
- Height: 1.68 m (5 ft 6 in)

Team information
- Current team: Lebanon (manager)

Senior career*
Years	Team	Apps	(Gls)
1990–1992	FC Barcelona		
1992–1993	FC Barcelona		
1993–1994	Alcantarilla		
1994–1995	Alcantarilla		
1994–1995	ElPozo Murcia		
1995–1996	Astorga		
1996–1997	FC Barcelona		
1997–1998	Martorell		
1998–1999	Cartagena		
1999–2000	CD Burela		
2000–2001	FC Barcelona		
2001–2002	Andorra		
2002–2003	Alabacete		
2003–2004	Granada 74		
2004–2005	AE Palma		
2005–2006	Manresa		
2005–2006	Corbera		

Managerial career
- 2006–2007: Can Tito Vilanova
- 2007–2008: Sharks
- 2008–2009: Stellamigo Hanamaki
- 2009–2010: Paraiso
- 2010: Győri ETO
- 2011: Costa Rica
- 2012–2014: Lebanon
- 2014–2015: Al-Yarmouk
- 2015–2016: Lebanon
- 2016–2017: Al-Shahania
- 2018–2019: Toronto
- 2019: Lebanon
- 2020: Lebanon
- * Club domestic league appearances and goals

Francisco Javier Araujo Fernández (born 17 May 1973), also known as Paco Araujo, is a Spanish futsal manager and former player. As a player, he played for FC Barcelona Futsal.

== Club career ==
Araujo has played for FC Barcelona, Martorell, Cartagena, Burela, and El Pozo de Murcia.

== Managerial career ==
As a manager, Araujo coached Can Tito Vilanova in Spain, Sharks and Stellamigo Iwate Hanamaki in Japan, Győri ETO in Hungary, and the Lebanon national team, whom he coached at the 2016 AFC Futsal Championship. He has also coached Paraiso in Costarica, as well as the Costa Rica national team.

On 16 February 2018, Araujo was appointed head coach of Futsal Club Toronto, a team in the Futsal Canadian Championship. On 28 September 2020, Araujo was re-appointed head coach of the Lebanon national futsal team, to coach them at the 2020 AFC Futsal Championship.

== Personal life ==
Born on 17 May 1973 in Barcelona, Spain, Araujo is married to Mery Sanchez and has two children: Uriel and Alexia.

== Career statistics ==
=== Club ===
Years	Club	Division
1990–1992	FC Barcelona Futsal	LNFS
1992–1993	FC Barcelona Futsal	LNFS
1993–1994	Alcantarilla F.S	LNFS
1994–1995	Alcantarilla F.S / ElPozo Murcia FS	LNFS
1995–1996	Astorga FS	LNFS
1996–1997	FC Barcelona Futsal	LNFS
1997–1998	FS Martorell	LNFS
1998–1999	FS Cartagena	LNFS
1999–2000	CD Burela FS	LNFS
2000–2001	FC Barcelona Futsal	LNFS
2001–2002	Andorra F.S	LNFS
2002–2003	Albacete FS	Segunda División de Futsal
2003–2004	Granada 74 F.S	Segunda División de Futsal
2004–2005	AE Palma Futsal	Segunda División de Futsal
2005–2006	Manresa F.S / Corbera F.S	Segunda División de Futsal

=== Managerial ===
Years	Club	Country	Division
2006–2007	Can tito Vilanova	Spain	1ª National A
2007–2008	Sharks Futsal	Japan	Kanto Futsal League
2008–2009	Stellamigo Hanamaki	Japan	F. League
2009–2010	Paraiso Futsal	Costa Rica	Liga Premier Masculina de Futsal de Costa Rica
2010	Győri ETO Futsal Club	Hungary	Hungary Futsal League
2011	Costa Rica National Team	Costa Rica	N/A
2012–2014	Lebanon national futsal team	Lebanon	N/A
2014–2015	Al-Yarmouk SC	Kuwait	Kuwaiti Futsal League
2015–2016	Lebanon national futsal team	Lebanon	N/A
2016–2017	Al-Shahania SC	Qatar	Qatar Futsal League
2018–2019	Futsal Club Toronto	Canada	Canadian Futsal Championship
2019	Lebanon national futsal team	Lebanon	N/A
2020	Lebanon national futsal team	Lebanon	N/A
