= Jesús Herrero =

Spanish futsal player

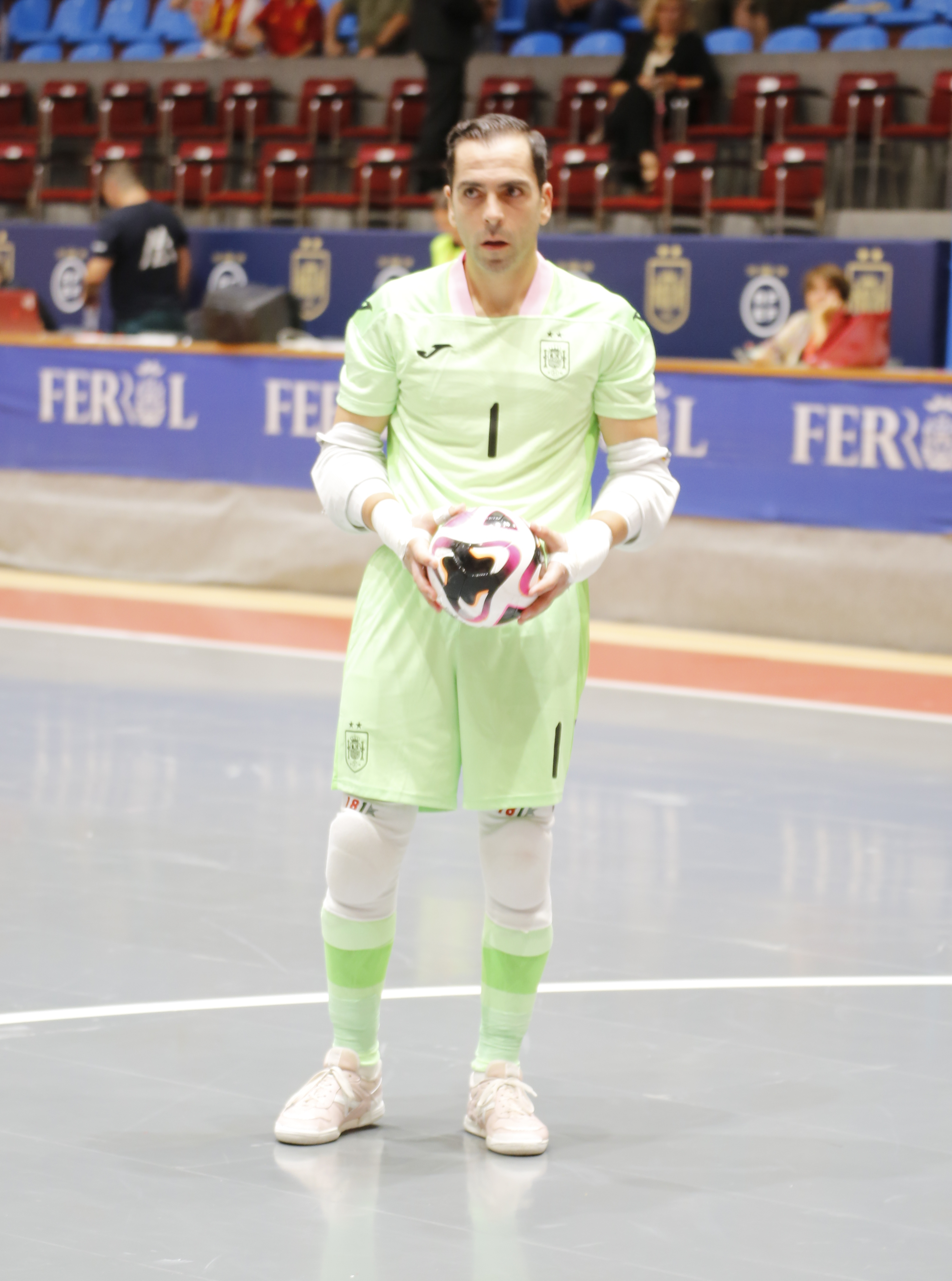

Personal information
- Full name: Jesús Herrero Parrón
- Date of birth: 4 November 1986 (age 39)
- Place of birth: Madrid, Spain
- Position: Goalkeeper

Team information
- Current team: Inter Movistar
- Number: 27

Youth career
- Carnicer Torrejón

Senior career*
Years	Team	Apps	(Gls)
2004–2005	Las Rozas		
2005–2008	Carnicer Torrejón		
2008–2010	Inter Movistar		
2010–2012	Talavera		
2012–2013	Segovia		
2013–	Inter Movistar		

International career
- Spain
- * Club domestic league appearances and goals

Jesús Herrero Parrón (born 4 November 1986), commonly known as Jesús Herrero, is a Spanish futsal player who plays for Inter Movistar as a Goalkeeper.
