= Rías Baixas FS =

Spanish futsal club

Fórum Filatélico
- Full name: Rías Baixas Fútbol Sala
- Nickname(s): --
- Founded: 1975
- Dissolved: 2004
- Ground: Pavillón Municipal, Pontevedra, Spain
- Capacity: 4,000
- 2003–04: 1ª Nacional B, 10th
Home colours	Away colours

Rías Baixas Fútbol Sala was a futsal club based in Pontevedra, Galicia. Rías Baixas was one of the most important futsal clubs from Galicia.

The club was founded in 1975 and its stadium was the ground Pavillón Municipal with capacity of 4,000 seats.

In the 1998–99 and 1999–00 seasons, its main sponsor was the defunct company Fórum Filatélico.

== History ==
The club was founded in 1975. First appearance in national category was in 1990–91 in Primera Nacional B. Two seasons after (1992–93), Rías Baixas achieve the promotion to the División de Plata. As one of the strongest teams of División de Plata, Rías Baixas reach the División de Honor, with only two season in División de Plata. Being sponsored by Fórum Filatélico in 1999–2000 season, the team finished in 16th position, being relegated to División de Plata. But club decides to renounce to this category, and start a new stage in Primera Nacional A. Eventually, the club was disbanded in 2003–04 season playing in Primera Nacional B.

== Season to season ==
Season	Division	Place	Copa de España
1990/91	1ª Nacional B	—	
1991/92	1ª Nacional B	1st	
1992/93	1ª Nacional A	2nd	
1993/94	D. Plata	3rd	
1994/95	D. Plata	1st	
1995/96	D. Honor	16th	
1996/97	D. Honor	14th	

Season	Division	Place	Copa de España
1997/98	D. Honor	10th	
1998/99	D. Honor	8th	
1999/00	D. Honor	16th	
2000/01	1ª Nacional A	—	
2001/02	1ª Nacional B	—	
2002/03	1ª Nacional B	—	
2003/04	1ª Nacional B	10th	

- 5 seasons in División de Honor
- 2 seasons in División de Plata
- 2 seasons in 1ª Nacional A
- 5 seasons in 1ª Nacional B

== Trophies ==
- División de Honor: 0
  - Quarterfinals: 1998–99
- Copa de España: 0
  - Quarterfinals: 1998–99
- División de Plata: 1
  - Winners: 1994–95
  - Semifinals: 1993–94
- Copa División de Plata: 1
  - Winners: 1994–95
  - Quarterfinals: 1993–94
