= Kelme (company) =

Spanish sportswear company

New Millenium Sports, S.L.
- Trade name: Kelme
- Type: Private
- Industry: Textile
- Founded: 1963; 63 years ago
- Founder: Diego Quiles; José Quiles
- Headquarters: Elche, Spain
- Area served: Worldwide
- Key people: Carlos García Cobaleda (president)
- Products: Football boots; Futsal shoes; Running shoes; Basketball shoes; Sportswear; Football jerseys; Training apparel; Tracksuits; Hoodies and jackets; Sports bags; Footballs; Sports accessories
- Owner: Abordador Capital; Riva y García; Inverama; Jinjiang Yuanxiang Garments Weaving
- Website: kelme.com

New Millennium Sports, S.L., trading as Kelme (Spanish pronunciation: [ˈkelme]), is a Spanish sports equipment manufacturing company that produces sportswear and athletic shoes. It was founded in 1963 by Diego and José Quiles and its products are destined for the football, futsal, basketball, running, cricket, and tennis markets. Kelme is headquartered in Spain, but has other offices worldwide.

== Sponsorships ==
Teams and athletes sponsored by Kelme worldwide include:

=== Cricket ===
==== National teams ====
- Nepal

=== Basketball ===
==== National teams ====
- Argentina
- Ivory Coast
- Moldova

==== Club teams ====
- (Bosnia and Herzegovina) Borac Banja Luka
- (South Korea) Busan KT Sonicboom
- (South Korea) Incheon ET Land Elephants
- (Lebanon) Al Riyadi Beirut
- (Lithuania) Neptūnas
- (Romania) Dinamo Bucuresti

=== Fencing ===
==== Federations ====
- Ukraine

=== Football ===
==== Confederations ====
- AFC

==== National teams ====
- Bosnia and Herzegovina
- Dominica
- Indonesia
- Jordan
- Lebanon
- Mongolia
- Nepal
- Palestine
- Suriname

==== Non-representative national teams ====
- Murcia

==== Ball supplier ====
- China League One
- Hong Kong Premier League
- Suriname Major League
- (Lebanon) Lebanese Premier League

==== Referees ====
- (Jordan) Jordanian Pro League
- Philippines Football League
- (Lebanon) Lebanese Premier League

==== Club teams ====
- (Algeria) WA Tlemcen
- (Angola) 1º de Agosto
- (Argentina) Almagro (from 2027)
- (Armenia) FC Gandzasar Kapan
- (Australia) Brisbane Roar (from 2026/27 season).
- (Australia) Macarthur FC
- (Bhutan) Druk Lhayul
- (Bhutan) Gomo Football Club
- (Bosnia and Herzegovina) Borac Banja Luka
- (Bosnia and Herzegovina) BSK Banja Luka
- (Bosnia and Herzegovina) Leotar
- (Bosnia and Herzegovina) Rudar Prijedor
- (Bosnia and Herzegovina) Široki Brijeg
- (Chile) Deportes Concepción
- (Brazil) América de Natal
- (Brazil) Brasil de Pelotas
- (Bulgaria) Beroe
- (Cambodia) Preah Khan Reach Svay Rieng FC
- (China) Foshan Nanshi
- (China) Guangdong Mingtu
- (China) Guangxi Pingguo Haliao
- (China) Jiangxi Lushan
- (China) Liaoning Tieren
- (China) Nanjing City
- (China) Qingdao Red Lions
- (China) Shanghai Jiading Huilong
- (China) Suzhou Dongwu
- (Egypt) Ceramica Cleopatra
- (Egypt) ENPPI
- (Egypt) Al Hammam
- (Egypt) Al Ittihad
- (Egypt) Pharco
- (Egypt) Smouha
- (Egypt) Tala'ea El Gaish
- (England) Watford
- (England) Maidenhead United
- (England) Wealdstone
- (Guatemala) Xelajú
- (Hong Kong) North District FC
- Hong Kong Rangers FC
- (Hong Kong) Sha Tin
- (Hong Kong) Southern
- (Hong Kong) Tai Po
- (Honduras) Real España
- (Indonesia) Persib Bandung
- (Iraq) Al-Quwa Al-Jawiya
- (Iraq) Al-Shorta
- (Iraq) Al-Talaba
- (Iraq) Duhok
- (Israel) Hapoel Holon
- (Israel) Hapoel Be'er Sheva
- (Japan) Thespa Gunma
- (Jordan) Al-Wehdat SC
- (Jordan) Al-Faisaly
- (Jordan) Al-Ramtha SC
- (Jordan) Al-Hussein SC (Irbid)
- (Jordan) Al-Salt
- Al-Jazeera Club (Jordan)
- (Jordan) Sahab SC
- (Jordan) Shabab Al-Ordon Club
- (South Korea) Bucheon FC 1995
- (South Korea) Gimcheon Sangmu
- (South Korea) Gwangju FC
- (South Korea) Hwaseong FC
- (Kyrgyzstan) Dordoi Bishkek
- (Lebanon) Ahed
- (Lebanon) Jwaya SC
- (Lebanon) Ansar
- (Lebanon) Safa SC
- (Lebanon) Bourj FC
- (Macau) Cheng Fung
- (Malaysia) FAM-MSN Project
- (Malaysia) PIB F.C.
- (Malaysia) Negeri Sembilan FC
- (Morocco) OCK
- Nepal Army Club
- (Nepal) New Road Team
- Nepal A.P.F. Club
- Nepal Police Club
- (Netherlands) Quick Boys
- (Oman) Al-Nahda
- (Oman) Al-Nasr
- (Panama) Union Cocle FC
- (Portugal) Belenenses SAD
- (Portugal) Boavista
- (Portugal) Machico
- (Portugal) Oliveirense
- (Saudi Arabia) Sajir
- (Serbia) Mladost
- (Singapore) Balestier Khalsa
- (Spain) Espanyol
- (Spain) Espanyol B
- (Spain) Kelme CF
- (Russia) Dynamo Bryansk
- (Sudan) Al-Hilal
- (Chinese Taipei) Tainan City
- (Suriname) Flora
- (Suriname) Transvaal
- (Suriname) Voorwaarts
- (Thailand) Nakhon Si United F.C.
- (Thailand) Ayutthaya United
- (Thailand) Buriram United Academy
- (Thailand) Chiangmai
- (Thailand) Chonburi Bluewave Futsal Club Academy
- (Thailand) Uthai Thani
- (Thailand) Rajpracha F.C.
- (Thailand) Songkhla
- (Tunisia) Club Africain
- (Ukraine) Balkany Zorya
- (Ukraine) Chornomorets Odesa
- (Ukraine) Dnipro Cherkasy
- (Ukraine) Metalurh Zaporizhzhia
- (Ukraine) Mynai
- (Ukraine) Olimpik Donetsk
- (Ukraine) Podillya Khmelnytskyi
- (Ukraine) Skoruk Tomakivka
- (Ukraine) Sumy
- (Ukraine) Tavriya Simferopol
- (Ukraine) Veres Rivne
- (Uruguay) Albion
- (Uruguay) Boston River
- (Uruguay) Defensor Sporting
- (Uzbekistan) Nasaf Qarshi
- (Vietnam) Vinh Long
- (Vietnam) Luxury Ha Long
- (Vietnam) Quang Nam FC
- (Vietnam) Trường Tươi Bình Phước FC
- (Zimbabwe) Chicken Inn FC

=== Track and field ===
==== National teams ====
- Cameroon

=== Futsal ===
- (Spain) Liga Nacional de Fútbol Sala
- (Lebanon) Lebanese Futsal League
- (Brazil) Ju Delgado
- (Spain) Benicarló F.S.
- (Spain) Caja Segovia FS
- (Spain) Elche CF
- (Spain) Sofía Rodriguez
- (Spain) Lorena Rubio
- (Spain) Laura Fernández
- (Spain) Patricia Chamorro
- (Spain) Arturo Santamaría
- (Spain) Dani Salgado
- (Slovenia) FC Litija
- (Slovenia) Oplast Kobarid
- (Saudi Arabia) Al Hilal

=== Esport ===
- (Spain) KOI

=== Roller hockey ===
- (Chile) Hockey Club San Jorge

== See also ==
- Kelme (cycling team)
