= FS Móstoles =

Spanish futsal club

Móstoles
- Full name: Fútbol Sala Móstoles / Club Deportivo Elemental; Móstoles Atlético Fútbol Sala
- Founded: 1989
- Dissolved: 2009
- Ground: Andrés Torrejón El Soto, Móstoles, Community of Madrid, Spain
- Capacity: 2,000
- 2008–09: 1ª Nacional A, 6th
Home colours	Away colours

Fútbol Sala Móstoles was a futsal club based in Móstoles, city in the autonomous community of Community of Madrid.

The club was founded in 1989 and her stadium was Pabellón Andrés Torrejón El Soto with capacity of 2,000 seaters.

The club had the sponsorship of Rey Juan Carlos University and Ayuntamiento de Móstoles.

== History ==
FS Móstoles was founded in 1989. playing its first years in local leagues. In 1996, the team makes it debut in División de Plata, after purchase seat of Mejorada FS. In 2009, the club merges with UD Boadilla Las Rozas and Sport Mirasierra to form Boadilla Las Rozas/Móstoles Mirasierra.

== Season to season ==
Season	Division	Place	Copa de España
1994/95	1ª Nacional B	1st	
1995/96	1ª Nacional A	—	
1996/97	D. Plata	8th	
1997/98	D. Plata	2nd	
1998/99	D. Plata	1st	
1999/00	D. Plata	1st	
2000/01	D. Honor	10th	
2001/02	D. Honor	13th	

Season	Division	Place	Copa de España
2002/03	D. Honor	9th	
2003/04	D. Honor	13th	
2004/05	D. Honor	14th	
2005/06	D. Honor	7th	
2006/07	D. Honor	7th	
2007/08	D. Honor	13th	
2008/09	1ª Nacional A	7th	

- 8 seasons in División de Honor
- 4 seasons in División de Plata
- 2 seasons in 1ª Nacional A

== Notable players ==
- (Brazil) Saad Assis
- (Spain) Borja Blanco
- (Spain) Paco Sedano
