= UD Guadalajara FS =

Spanish futsal club

Guadalajara
- Full name: Union Deportiva; Guadalajara; Futbol Sala
- Nickname: --
- Founded: 2000
- Dissolved: 2012
- Ground: Multiusos de Guadalajara, Guadalajara, Castile-La Mancha, Spain
- Capacity: 1,600
- 2011–12: 2ª División B, 12th
Home colours	Away colours

Union Deportiva Guadalajara Fútbol Sala is a futsal club based in Guadalajara, city of the province of Guadalajara in the autonomous community of Castile-La Mancha.

The club was founded in 2000 and its pavilion is Multiusos de Guadalajara with capacity of 1,600 seaters.

The club has the sponsorship of Gestesa.

The club filed for bankruptcy on September 19, 2012, being subsequently disbanded.

== Season to season ==
Season	Division	Place	Copa de España
2000/01	D. Plata	4th	
2001/02	D. Plata	3rd	
2002/03	D. Plata	1st	
2003/04	D. Honor	15th	
2004/05	D. Plata	3rd	
2005/06	D. Plata	1st	

Season	Division	Place	Copa de España
2006/07	D. Honor	14th	
2007/08	D. Honor	14th	
2008/09	D. Honor	13th	
2009/10	D. Honor	10th	
2010/11	D. Honor	16th	
2011/12	2ª División B	12th	

- 6 seasons in División de Honor
- 5 seasons in División de Plata
- 1 seasons in Segunda División B

== Former players ==
- (Spain) Juanra
