= Albacete FS =

Albacete
- Full name: Club Albacete Futbol Sala
- Nickname: --
- Founded: 1984
- Ground: Pabellón Universitario, Albacete
- Capacity: 1,200
- Chairman: Manuel Gómez
- Manager: Domingo Cuartero
- League: 3ª División – Group 16
- 2014–15: 3ª División – Group 16, 11th
Home colours	Away colours

Albacete Fútbol Sala is a futsal club based in Albacete, the capital city of the province of Albacete in the autonomous community of Castilla–La Mancha.

The club was founded in 1984 and its pavilion is Pabellón Universitario with capacity of 1,200 seaters.

The club's bat on the badge is similar to that of the city's football (soccer) team, Albacete Balompié.

== Season to season ==
Season	Tier	Division	Place	Notes
1992/93	3	1ª Nacional B	3rd	
1993/94	3	1ª Nacional A	3rd	
1994/95	2	D. Plata	9th	
1995/96	2	D. Plata	3rd	
1996/97	2	D. Plata	5th	
1997/98	2	D. Plata	3rd	
1998/99	2	D. Plata	4th	
1999/00	2	D. Plata	4th	
2000/01	2	D. Plata	4th	
2001/02	2	D. Plata	4th	
2002/03	2	D. Plata	3rd	
2003/04	2	D. Plata	1st	

Season	Tier	Division	Place	Notes
2004/05	2	D. Plata	1st	
2005/06	1	D. Honor	16th	
2006/07	2	D. Plata	3rd	
2007/08	2	D. Plata	7th	
2008/09	2	D. Plata	7th	
2009/10	2	D. Plata	12th	
2010/11	2	D. Plata	18th	relegated
2011/12	3	2ª División B	9th	
2012/13	3	2ª División B	15th	relegated
2013/14	4	3ª División	14th	
2014/15	4	3ª División	11th	
2015/16	4	3ª División	—	

- 1 season in Primera División
- 14 seasons in Segunda División
- 3 season in Segunda División B
- 2 season in Tercera División
