= Xerez DFC Fútbol Sala =

Spanish futsal club

Xerez
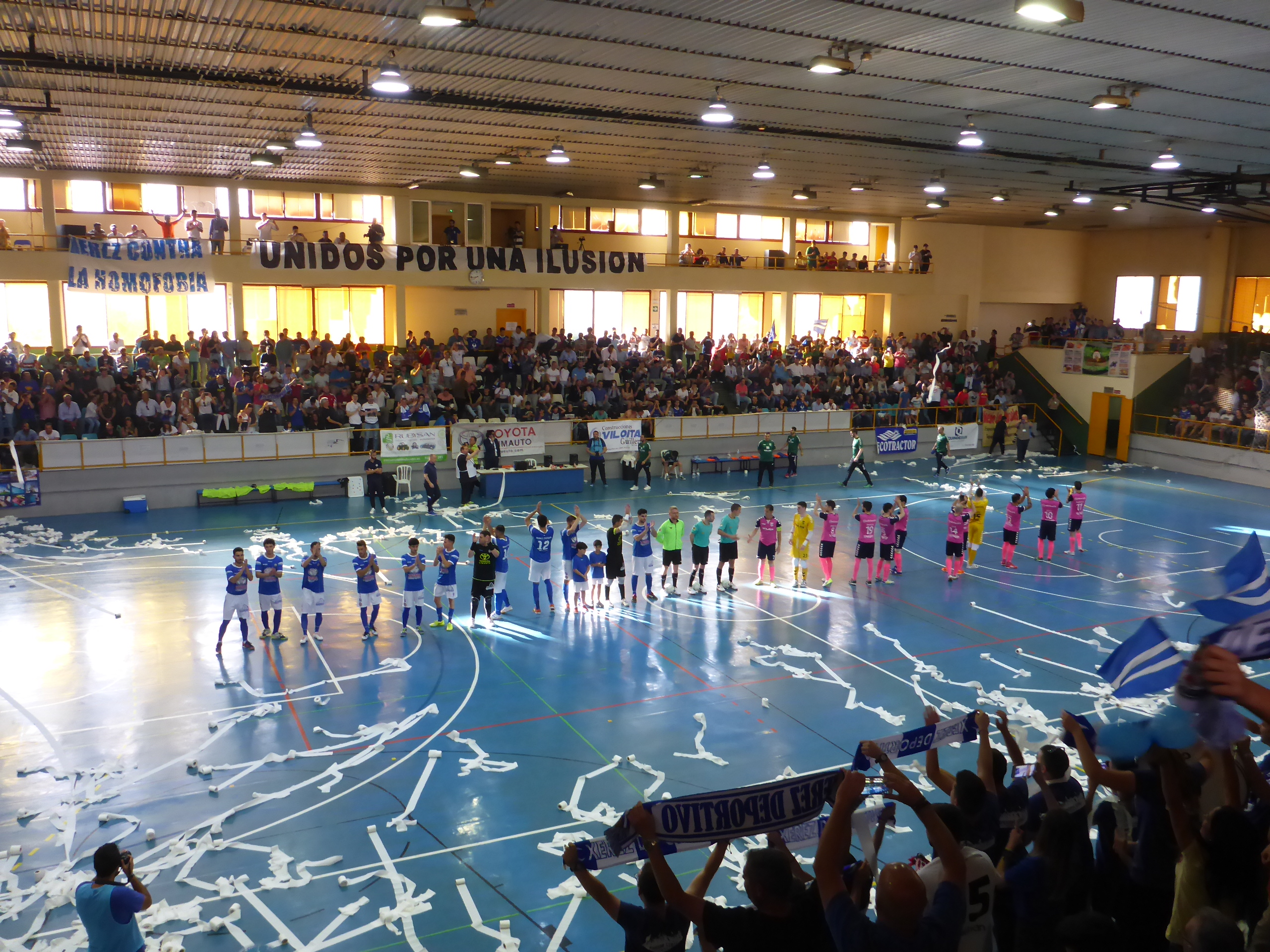
- Full name: Xerez Deportivo Fútbol Club
- Nickname(s): Xerecistas; Azulinos; Efecé
- Founded: 31 July 2014
- Ground: Polideportivo Ruiz-Mateos, Jerez, Andalusia, Spain
- Capacity: 1,220
- Chairman: Rafael Coca de los Reyes
- Manager: Juan Carlos Gálvez
- League: 2ª División B
- 2017–18: 1st
- Website: http://xerezdeportivofc.com
Home colours

Xerez DFC Fútbol Sala, also called Xerez Toyota Nimauto for sponsorship reasons, is a spanish futsal team from Jerez de la Frontera, in Andalusia (Spain). The team plays in 2ª División B, holding home matches at Polideportivo Ruiz Mateos, in Jerez, with an overall 1,220-seat capacity. The team colours are usually blue shirts and socks, with white shorts.

== History ==
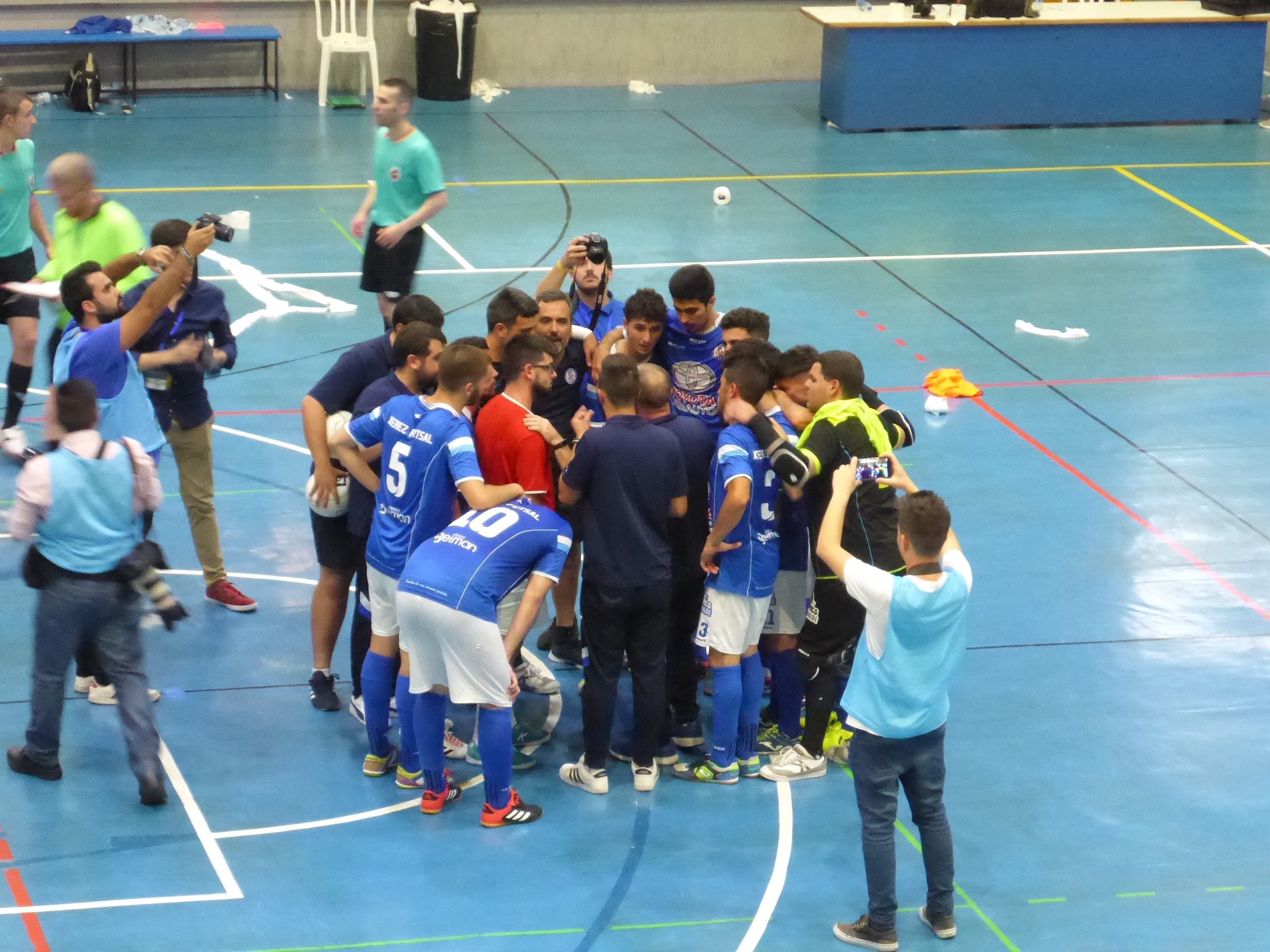
Match

It was created on 31 July 2014 by the Assembly of Xerecistas. It started to play in Tercera División Andaluza, in province of Seville, due to there were not enough futsal teams in province of Cádiz to form a league. Xerez Toyota Nimauto promoted to Tercera División in March 2015 after winning the league. On 28 May 2015, Xerez Toyota Nimauto got the second place and promoted to 2º División B.

== Seasons ==
Season	Tier	Division	Place	Notes
2014–15	6	Tercera Andaluza	1st	promoted to 3º División directly
2015–16	4	Tercera División	2nd	promoted to 2º División B
2016–17	3	Segunda División B	4th	
2017-18	3	Segunda División B	1st	

== Current squad ==
Num.	Nac.	Name	Nickname	Position
1	(Spain)	Juan Luis Mulero Oliva	JUANLU	Portero
15	(Spain)	Manuel Pérez Herrera	MANUEL	Portero
2	(Spain)	Jesús Algaba Garrucho	JESÚS	Ala
3	(Spain)	Antonio Vital Solís	TOMATE	Cierre
4	(Spain)	Germán Cruz Romero	GERMÁN	Pivot
5	(Spain)	Manuel Partida Aparicio	PARTIDA	Cierre
6	(Spain)	Cristian Castillo Sánchez	CRISTIAN	Ala
7	(Spain)	Mario Santiago Pedrejón	MARIO	Ala
8	(Spain)	Raúl Carrillo Romero	RAÚL	Pívot
9	(Spain)	Samuel Rodríguez Pereira	SAMUELITO	Ala
10	(Spain)	Francisco Atienza Gil	PAQUITO	Ala
11	(Spain)	Antonio de la Flor Herrera	ANTOÑITO	Pivot
12	(Spain)	Christian Delgado Chamorro	CHRISTIAN	Ala
16	(Spain)	Juan Moreno Lebrero	JUAN	Pivot

Coach: (Spain) Juan Carlos Gálvez

== Presidents ==
President	Years
(Spain) Jose Ravelo	31 July 2014 – 20 June 2017
(Spain) Rafael Coca	20 June 2017 – 20 June 2021

== Coaches ==
Coach	Years
(Spain) Sergio Barroso	2014 – 2017
(Spain) Juan Carlos Gálvez	2017 – Currently

== See also ==
- Xerez Deportivo FC
- Club de Rugby Xerez Deportivo FC
- Atletismo Chapín Xerez Deportivo FC
