= Carnicer Torrejón FS =

Spanish futsal club

Carnicer Torrejón Fútbol Sala
- Full name: Carnicer Torrejón; Fútbol Sala
- Founded: 1985
- Dissolved: May 2014
- Ground: Jorge Garbajosa, Torrejón de Ardoz, Community of Madrid, Spain
- Capacity: 4,500
- 2013–14: 2ª División B – Group 4, 4th
Home colours	Away colours

Carnicer Torrejón Fútbol Sala was a futsal club based in Torrejón de Ardoz, city in the autonomous community of Community of Madrid.

The club was founded in 1985 and its arena is Pabellón Jorge Garbajosa with capacity of 4,500 seaters.

== History ==
Before 2012–13 season, the club was excluded of Primera División due to failing to meet the financial criteria of LNFS being relegated next season to Segunda División.

In June 2013, the team was relegated another division for failing to meet financial criteria of LNFS, dropping to Segunda División B.

In May 2014, the club was closed down due to little support received from the public and private institutions.

== Season to season ==
Season	Tier	Division	Place	Notes
1993/94	4	1ª Nacional B	—	
1994/95	3	1ª Nacional A	—	
1995/96	2	D. Plata	11th	
1996/97	2	D. Plata	1st	
1997/98	1	D. Honor	9th	
1998/99	1	D. Honor	9th	
1999/00	1	D. Honor	8th	
2000/01	1	D. Honor	7th	
2001/02	1	D. Honor	11th	
2002/03	1	D. Honor	13th	
2003/04	1	D. Honor	14th	

Season	Tier	Division	Place	Notes
2004/05	1	D. Honor	11th	
2005/06	1	D. Honor	10th	
2006/07	1	D. Honor	8th	
2007/08	1	D. Honor	4th	
2008/09	1	D. Honor	11th	
2009/10	1	D. Honor	8th	
2010/11	1	D. Honor	10th	
2011/12	1	1ª División	7th	
2012/13	2	2ª División	3rd	
2013/14	3	2ª División B	4th	

- 15 seasons in Primera División
- 3 seasons in Segunda División
- 2 seasons in Segunda División B
- 1 seasons in Tercera División

== Notable former players ==
- (Spain) Juanra
- (Spain) Carlitos Ortiz
- (Spain) Chechu Herrero
- (Portugal) Leitão

== Externan link ==
- Official website
