= 2008–09 División de Plata de Futsal =

División de Plata
- Season: 2008–09
- Promoted: Sala 10 Zaragoza & Arcebansa Zamora
- Relegated: No relegations
- Top goalscorer: Paco (Clipeus Nazareno), 26 goals
- Biggest home win: Arcebansa Zamora 9–1 Butagaz Andorra
- Biggest away win: Jumilla Montesinos 2–8 UMA Antequera
- Highest scoring: Butagaz Andorra 9–7 Obras y Estructuras RAM

The 2008–09 season of the División de Plata is the 16th season of second-tier futsal in Spain.

== Regular season ==
=== League table - Group Norte ===
Position	Club	Played	Wins	Draws	Losses	Goals for	Goals against	Points
1	Arcebansa Zamora	20	14	2	4	74	44	44
2	Sala 10 Zaragoza	20	14	2	4	92	65	44
3	Burela Pescados Rubén	20	12	6	2	74	36	42
4	Az. Ramos Talavera	20	10	3	7	75	65	33
5	Sport Sala Villaverde	20	9	2	9	77	88	29
6	Butagaz Andorra	20	8	4	8	78	79	28
7	Forma Cáceres 2016	20	6	4	10	72	72	22
8	La Rápita	20	6	3	11	53	74	21
9	Tecuni Bilbo	20	5	5	10	61	75	20
10	Ocaña Puertas Uniarte	20	5	3	12	53	76	18
11	Obras y Estructuras RAM	20	2	4	14	53	88	10

promotion playoffs

=== League table - Group Sur ===
Position	Club	Played	Wins	Draws	Losses	Goals for	Goals against	Points
1	UMA Antequera	20	12	4	4	95	68	40
2	M.M. Pérez Bujalance	20	12	1	7	57	51	37
3	ElPozo Ciudad de Murcia	20	9	4	7	60	58	31
4	UPV Maristas Valencia	20	9	4	7	70	61	31
5	Lanzarote Tias Yaiza	20	10	0	10	67	70	30
6	Elecnor Ibi	20	8	4	8	65	62	28
7	Albacete 2010	20	7	5	8	67	67	26
8	Clipeus Nazareno	20	8	2	10	63	69	26
9	Puertollano Restaurante Dacho	20	6	7	7	55	53	25
10	Colegios Arenas Gáldar	20	6	3	11	69	82	21
11	Jumilla Montesinos	20	4	4	12	55	82	16

promotion playoffs

== Playoffs for promotion ==
=== Group A ===
- Scores and Standings

Team	Pld	W	D	L	GF	GA	Pts
Sala 10 Zaragoza	10	9	0	1	48	16	29
UMA Antequera	10	5	1	4	36	35	19
Forma Cáceres 2016	10	3	4	3	31	37	13
ElPozo Ciudad de Murcia	10	3	2	5	29	33	12
Lanzarote Tias Yaiza	10	3	2	5	39	40	11
Az. Ramos Talavera	10	2	1	7	28	50	7

	AZT	EPO	FMC	LTY	S10	UMA
AZT	–	5–1	5–5	2–6	5–7	6–4
EPO	4–1	–	4–4	3–7	1–3	1–3
FMC	3–2	1–6	–	4–2	2–3	4–2
LTY	8–1	4–4	3–3	–	1–5	4–6
S10	6–0	1–2	7–2	7–0	–	5–2
UMA	6–1	4–3	3–3	5–4	1–4	–

- UMA Antequera, Sala 10 Zaragoza and ElPozo Ciudad de Murcia begins respectively with 3, 2 and 1 point(s) added.

promoted

=== Group B ===
- Scores and Standings

Team	Pld	W	D	L	GF	GA	Pts
Arcebansa Zamora	10	7	1	2	38	24	25
Burela Pescados Rubén	10	6	1	3	34	20	20
Puertollano R. Dacho	10	5	2	3	33	31	17
UPV Maristas Valencia	10	5	1	4	26	25	16
Butagaz Andorra	10	2	1	7	22	37	7
M.M. Pérez Bujalance	10	0	4	6	19	35	6

	ACZ	BUR	BUT	MPB	PUE	UPV
ACZ	–	5–3	4–2	4–3	5–0	6–3
BUR	5–1	–	3–0	5–1	8–2	1–0
BUT	2–6	2–4	–	4–2	1–3	4–3
MPB	3–3	1–1	2–2	–	3–3	3–5
PUE	3–2	5–2	5–1	7–3	–	1–1
UPV	0–2	3–2	3–2	3–0	5–4	–

- Arcebansa Zamora, M.M. Pérez Bujalance and Burela Pescados Rubén begins respectively with 3, 2 and 1 point(s) added.

promoted

== Top goal scorers ==
- ,

Player	Goals	Team
Paco	26	Clipeus Nazareno
Joan	25	Azulejos Ramos Talavera
Corvo	24	Sala 10 Zaragoza
Renatinho	22	Burela Pescados Rubén
Carlos Alberto	20	Arcebansa Zamora
Fran Espinosa	20	UMA Antequera
Nacho	20	UMA Antequera
Néstor	19	Colegios Arenas Gáldar
A. Vega	18	Forma Cáceres 2016
Thiago	17	Lanzarote Tias Yaiza

== See also ==
- 2008–09 División de Honor de Futsal
- División de Honor de Futsal
- Futsal in Spain
