= Paco Sedano =

Spanish futsal player

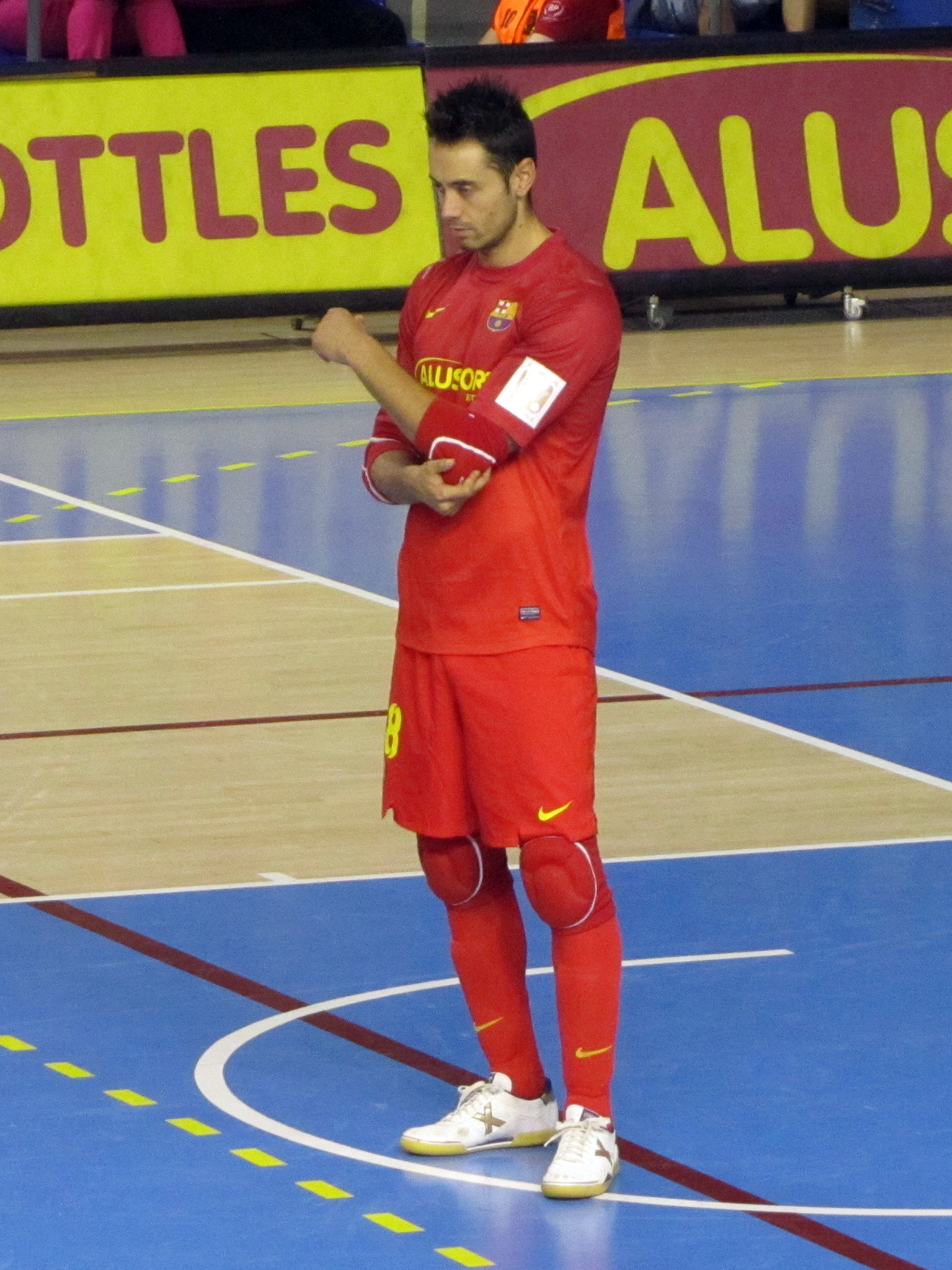

Personal information
- Full name: Francisco Sedano Antolín
- Date of birth: 2 December 1979 (age 46)
- Place of birth: Madrid, Spain
- Position: Goalkeeper

Senior career*
Years	Team	Apps	(Gls)
1998–1999	Coslada		
1999–2007	Móstoles	159	(1)
2007–2018	Barcelona	114	(6)

International career
- Spain
- * Club domestic league appearances and goals

Francisco Sedano Antolín (born 2 December 1979), commonly known as Paco Sedano, is a Spanish retired futsal player who last played for Barcelona as a goalkeeper.

== Honours ==
=== Club ===
Coslada

- 1 promotion to División de Plata (1995–96)

Móstoles

- 1 División de Plata championship (1999-2000)
- 1 promotion to División de Honor (1999-2000)
- 1 Copa Comunidad de Madrid (2004)

Barcelona

- 3 Spanish futsal leagues (2010–11, 2011–12, 2012–13)
- 3 Copa de España (2011, 2012, 2013)
- 1 Copa de S.M. El Rey (2011)
- 1 UEFA Futsal Cup (2011)

=== International ===
Spain

- 1 FIFA Futsal World Cup (2004)
- 2 Futsal Euro (2005, 2016)

=== Individual ===
- Best player Copa Comunidad de Madrid (2004)
