= Atlético Boadilla FS =

Spanish futsal club

Gervasport Boadilla
- Full name: Atlético Boadilla Fútbol Sala
- Nickname(s): --
- Founded: 1991
- Dissolved: 2004
- Ground: Pabellón Municipal, Boadilla del Monte, Community of Madrid, Spain
- Capacity: 1,400
- Chairman: (Spain) Hugo Alonso
- Manager: (Spain) Paulino Rentero
- 2003–04: División de Honor, 11th
Home colours	Away colours

Atlético Boadilla Fútbol Sala was a futsal club based in Boadilla del Monte, city of the Community of Madrid.

Her pavilion was Pabellón Municipal with capacity of 1,400 seaters.

The main sponsor in its history was Gervasport.

The team played in many localities before its arrival to Boadilla del Monte.

== History ==
- The club was founded in 1991 as Club Deportivo Atlanta, and initially, the team played its matches in the Hortaleza neighborhood (Madrid). After a transfer to Algete municipality, the club was finally resettled in Boadilla del Monte. In 2004, the club was merged with CFS Las Rozas to form UD Las Rozas Boadilla, playing its matches in Las Rozas.

== Season to season ==
Season	Division	Place	Copa de España
1998/99	D. Plata	5th	
1999/00	D. Plata	6th	
2000/01	D. Plata	1st	
2001/02	D. Honor	8th	
2002/03	D. Honor	6th	
2003/04	D. Honor	11th	

- 3 seasons in División de Honor
- 3 seasons in División de Plata
