= 2007–08 División de Honor de Futsal =

División de Honor
- Season: 2007–08
- Champions: Interviú Fadesa
- Relegated: Sala 10 Zaragoza & Leis Pontevedra
- UEFA Futsal Cup: Interviú Fadesa
- Matches played: 240
- Goals scored: 1,622 (6.76 per match)
- Top goalscorer: Betão, 31 goals
- Biggest home win: Caja Segovia 10–0 Leis Pontevedra
- Biggest away win: Leis Pontevedra 2–13 Carnicer Torrejón
- Highest scoring: MRA Navarra 12–3 Móstoles 2008

The 2007–08 season of the División de Honor de Futsal is the 19th season of top-tier futsal in Spain.

== Regular season table ==
Title Play-Off
Relegation

P	Team	Pld	W	D	L	GF	GA	Pts
1	ElPozo Murcia Turística	30	22	6	2	138	82	72
2	Interviú Fadesa	30	17	10	3	124	80	61
3	Benicarló Onda Urbana	30	13	10	7	97	81	49
4	Carnicer Torrejón	30	13	8	9	112	96	47
5	Azkar Lugo	30	12	11	7	95	81	47
6	Barcelona Senseit	30	13	6	11	103	85	45
7	A. Lobelle de Santiago	30	12	9	9	101	99	45
8	Playas de Castellón	30	12	7	11	103	111	43
9	Caja Segovia	30	11	9	10	117	80	42
10	Armiñana Valencia	30	10	12	8	99	95	42
11	MRA Navarra	30	9	6	15	94	107	33
12	Muebles Tuco	30	8	7	15	87	119	31
13	Móstoles 2008	30	9	4	17	111	144	31
14	Gestesa Guadalajara	30	6	11	13	88	108	29
15	DKV Seguros Zaragoza	30	6	8	16	93	124	26
16	Leis Pontevedra	30	4	2	24	60	130	14

*At end of season, Armiñana Valencia & Móstoles 2008 were forced to relegation due to economic limitations.

== Championship playoffs ==
quarter-finals
ElPozo Murcia Turística	4	2 (5)	_
Playas de Castellón	0	2 (3)	_
Carnicer Torrejón	1	6 (5)	5
Azkar Lugo	3	6 (4)	2
Interviú Fadesa	4	4	5
A. Lobelle	5	1	3
Benicarló	1	1	_
Barcelona Senseit	7	4	_

semifinals
ElPozo Murcia Turística	3	2	_
Carnicer Torrejón	0	1	_
Interviú Fadesa	5	3	_
Barcelona Senseit	2	2	_

final
ElPozo Murcia Turística	1	5
Interviú Fadesa	3	8

2007–08 División de Honor winners
(Community of Madrid)
Interviú Fadesa
Eighth title

The Finals were broadcast in Spain on RTVE.

=== Matches ===
2007–08 Championship playoffs matches

==== Quarter-finals ====
(1) ElPozo Murcia Turística vs. (8) Playas de Castellón:

- Game 1 6 May @ Murcia: ElPozo Murcia Turística 4-0 Playas de Castellón
- Game 2 10 May @ Castellón: Playas de Castellón 2-2 ElPozo Murcia Turística // Pen: 3-5

ElPozo Murcia Turística wins the series 2-0

- Total Aggregate: 6-2

(2) Interviú Fadesa vs. (7) Autos Lobelle de Santiago:

- Game 1 6 May @ Alcalá de Henares: Interviú Fadesa 4-5 Autos Lobelle de Santiago
- Game 2 10 May @ Santiago de Compostela: Autos Lobelle de Santiago 1-4 Interviú Fadesa
- Game 3 17 May @ Alcalá de Henares: Interviú Fadesa 5-3 Autos Lobelle de Santiago

Interviú Fadesa wins the series 2-1

- Total Aggregate: 13-9

(3) Benicarló Onda Urbana vs. (6) FC Barcelona Senseit:

- Game 1 6 May @ Benicarló: Benicarló Onda Urbana 1-7 FC Barcelona Senseit
- Game 2 10 May @ Barcelona: FC Barcelona Senseit 4-1 Benicarló Onda Urbana

FC Barcelona Senseit wins the series 2-0

- Total Aggregate: 2-11

(4) Carnicer Torrejón vs. (5) Azkar Lugo:

- Game 1 6 May @ Torrejón de Ardoz: Carnicer Torrejón 1-3 Azkar Lugo
- Game 2 10 May @ Lugo: Azkar Lugo 6-6 Carnicer Torrejón // Pen: 4-5
- Game 3 17 May @ Torrejón de Ardoz: Carnicer Torrejón 5-2 Azkar Lugo

Carnicer Torrejón wins the series 2-1

- Total Aggregate: 12-11

==== Semifinals ====
(1) ElPozo Murcia Turística vs. (4) Carnicer Torrejón:

- Game 1 20 May @ Murcia: ElPozo Murcia Turística 3-0 Carnicer Torrejón
- Game 2 24 May @ Torrejón de Ardoz: Carnicer Torrejón 1-2 ElPozo Murcia Turística

ElPozo Murcia Turística wins the series 2-0

- Total Aggregate: 5-2

(2) Interviú Fadesa vs. (6) FC Barcelona Senseit:

- Game 1 20 May @ Alcalá de Henares: Interviú Fadesa 5-2 FC Barcelona Senseit
- Game 2 23 May @ Barcelona: FC Barcelona Senseit 2-3 Interviú Fadesa

Interviú Fadesa wins the series 2-0

- Total Aggregate: 8-4

==== Final ====
(1) ElPozo Murcia Turística vs. (2) Interviú Fadesa:

- Game 1 31 May @ Murcia: ElPozo Murcia Turística 1-3 Interviú Fadesa
- Game 2 7 June @ Alcalá de Henares: Interviú Fadesa 8-5 ElPozo Murcia Turística

Interviú Fadesa wins the series 2-0

- Total Aggregate: 6-11

CHAMPION: : Inteviú Fadesa

== Top goal scorers ==
- As day 30 of 30

Player	Goals	Team
Betao	31	Autos Lobelle de Santiago FS
Borja	31	Móstoles 2008 FS
Guga	28	Caja Segovia FS
Eka	26	DKV Seguros Zaragoza FS
Wilde	26	ElPozo Murcia FS
Mauricio	25	ElPozo Murcia FS
Dani Fernández	24	FC Barcelona Senseit
Lukaian	24	MRA Navarra
Deives	23	Benicarló Onda Urbana
Juanra	23	Carnicer Torrejón

== TV Coverage ==
- TVE2
- Teledeporte
- Barça TV
- Punt 2
- Telecartagena
- Aragón Televisión
- Canal 33
- IB3

== See also ==
- División de Honor de Futsal
- Futsal in Spain
