= 2006–07 División de Honor de Futsal =

División de Honor
- Season: 2006–07
- Champions: ElPozo Murcia Turística
- Relegated: Martorell & Cometal Celta de Vigo
- UEFA Futsal Cup: ElPozo Murcia Turística
- Matches played: 240
- Goals scored: 1,716 (7.15 per match)
- Top goalscorer: Fernandão, 38 goals
- Biggest home win: Polaris World Cartagena 11–0 DKV Seguros Zaragoza
- Biggest away win: FC Barcelona 1–10 Polaris World Cartagena
- Highest scoring: ElPozo Murcia Turística 10–7 DKV Seguros Zaragoza

The 2006–07 season of the División de Honor de Futsal is the 18th season of top-tier futsal in Spain.

== Regular season ==
=== League table ===
| Pos | Team | Pld | W | D | L | GF | GA | GD | Pts | Qualification or relegation |
|---|---|---|---|---|---|---|---|---|---|---|
| 1 | Boomerang Interviú | 30 | 19 | 9 | 2 | 112 | 63 | +49 | 66 | Title Play-Off |
| 2 | Polaris World Cartagena | 30 | 18 | 4 | 8 | 137 | 83 | +54 | 58 | Title Play-Off |
| 3 | ElPozo Murcia Turística | 30 | 16 | 4 | 10 | 137 | 110 | +27 | 52 | Title Play-Off |
| 4 | Benicarló Onda Urbana | 30 | 14 | 7 | 9 | 94 | 85 | +9 | 49 | Title Play-Off |
| 5 | MRA Navarra | 30 | 14 | 7 | 9 | 119 | 99 | +20 | 49 | Title Play-Off |
| 6 | Caja Segovia | 30 | 12 | 10 | 8 | 107 | 88 | +19 | 46 | Title Play-Off |
| 7 | PSG Móstoles | 30 | 12 | 10 | 8 | 112 | 119 | −7 | 46 | Title Play-Off |
| 8 | Carnicer Torrejón | 30 | 12 | 8 | 10 | 105 | 110 | −5 | 44 | Title Play-Off |
| 9 | Azkar Lugo | 30 | 12 | 7 | 11 | 110 | 101 | +9 | 43 | |
| 10 | Playas de Castellón | 30 | 13 | 4 | 13 | 127 | 111 | +16 | 43 | |
| 11 | Autos Lobelle de Santiago | 30 | 10 | 9 | 11 | 108 | 124 | −16 | 39 | |
| 12 | DKV Seguros Zaragoza | 30 | 8 | 7 | 15 | 112 | 133 | −21 | 31 | |
| 13 | Barcelona Senseit | 30 | 8 | 7 | 15 | 80 | 107 | −27 | 31 | |
| 14 | Gestesa Guadalajara | 30 | 6 | 6 | 18 | 94 | 131 | −37 | 24 | Relegation play-off |
| 15 | Martorell | 30 | 6 | 6 | 18 | 77 | 121 | −44 | 24 | Relegation |
| 16 | Cometal Celta de Vigo | 30 | 4 | 7 | 19 | 85 | 131 | −46 | 19 | Relegation |

== Playoffs ==
=== Championship playoffs ===
quarter-finals
Boomerang Interviú | 8 | 4 | _
Carnicer Torrejón | 4 | 2 | _
Benicarló Onda Urbana | 2 (3) | 4 | 7
MRA Navarra | 2 (4) | 3 | 0
Polaris World Cartagena | 3 | 4 | _
PSG Móstoles | 0 | 3 | _
ElPozo Murcia Turística | 4 (5) | 3 | 2
Caja Segovia | 4 (4) | 4 | 1

semifinals
Boomerang Interviú | 5 | 4 | _
Benicarló Onda Urbana | 1 | 3 | _
Polaris World Cartagena | 3 (5) | 3 | _
ElPozo Murcia Turística | 3 (6) | 4 | _

final
Boomerang Interviú | 7 | 2
ElPozo Murcia Turística | 8 | 3

2006–07 División de Honor winners
(Region of Murcia)
ElPozo Murcia Turística
Third title

The Finals were broadcast in Spain on RTVE.

=== Championship playoffs matches ===
2006–07 Championship playoffs matches

==== Quarter-finals ====
(1) Boomerang Interviú vs. (8) Carnicer Torrejón:

- Game 1 23 May @ Alcalá de Henares: Boomerang Interviú 8-4 Carnicer Torrejón
- Game 2 26 May @ Torrejón de Ardoz: Carnicer Torrejón 2-4 Boomerang Interviú

Boomerang Interviú wins the series 2-0

- Total Aggregate: 12-6

(2) Polaris World Cartagena vs. (7) PSG Móstoles:

- Game 1 23 May @ Cartagena: Polaris World Cartagena 3-0 PSG Móstoles
- Game 2 26 May @ Móstoles: PSG Móstoles 3-4 Polaris World Cartagena

Polaris World Cartagena wins the series 2-0

- Total Aggregate: 7-3

(3) ElPozo Murcia Turística vs. (6) Caja Segovia:

- Game 1 23 May @ Murcia: ElPozo Murcia Turística 4-4 Caja Segovia // Pen: 5-4
- Game 2 26 May @ Segovia: Caja Segovia 4-3 ElPozo Murcia Turística
- Game 3 2 June @ Murcia: ElPozo Murcia Turística 2-1 Caja Segovia

ElPozo Murcia Turística wins the series 2-1

- Total Aggregate: 9-9

(4) Benicarló Onda Urbana vs. (5) MRA Navarra:

- Game 1 23 May @ Benicarló: Benicarló Onda Urbana 2-2 MRA Navarra // Pen: 3-4
- Game 2 26 May @ Pamplona: MRA Navarra 3-4 Benicarló Onda Urbana
- Game 3 2 June @ Benicarló: Benicarló Onda Urbana 7-0 MRA Navarra

Benicarló Onda Urbana wins the series 2-1

- Total Aggregate: 13-5

==== Semifinals ====
(1) Boomerang Interviú vs. (4) Benicarló Onda Urbana

- Game 1 7 May @ Alcalá de Henares: Boomerang Interviú 5-1 Benicarló Onda Urbana
- Game 2 10 May @ Benicarló: Benicarló Onda Urbana 3-4 Boomerang Interviú

Boomerang Interviú wins the series 2-0

- Total Aggregate: 9-4

(2) Polaris World Cartagena vs. (3) ElPozo Murcia Turística

- Game 1 7 May @ Cartagena: Polaris World Cartagena 3-3 ElPozo Murcia Turística // Pen: 5-6
- Game 2 10 May @ Murcia: ElPozo Murcia Turística 4-3 Polaris World Cartagena

ElPozo Murcia Turística wins the series 2-0

- Total Aggregate: 6-7

==== Final ====
(1) Boomerang Interviú vs. (3) ElPozo Murcia Turística:

- Game 1 @ Alcalá de Henares: Boomerang Interviú 7-8 ElPozo Murcia Turística
- Game 2 @ Murcia: ElPozo Murcia Turística 3-2 Boomerang Interviú

ElPozo Murcia Turística wins the series 2-0

- Total Aggregate: 9-11

CHAMPION: : ElPozo Murcia Turística

=== Relegation playoff ===
| relegation playoff |
| Gestesa Guadalajara | 1 | 2 | 3 | 5 | 2 |
| Marfil Santa Coloma | 0 | 6 | 1 | 6 | 1 |

- Gestesa Guadalajara remained in División de Honor.

== See also ==
- División de Honor de Futsal
- Futsal in Spain
