= Xota FS =

Spanish futsal club

Osasuna Magna Xota
- Full name: Xota Fútbol Sala
- Founded: 1978
- Ground: Pabellón Anaitasuna, Pamplona, Navarre, Spain
- Capacity: 3,000
- Chairman: (Spain) José Antonio Arregui
- Coach: (Spain) Miguel Hernández
- League: Primera División
- 2022–23: Regular season: 14th of 16; Playoffs: DNQ
- Website: http://xota.es/
Home colours	Away colours

Club Deportivo Xota Fútbol Sala, known as Osasuna Magna Gurpea for sponsorship reasons, is a Spanish futsal club based in Pamplona, in the autonomous community of Navarre. The club is sponsored currently (October 2013) by Magnesitas Navarras.

The club was founded in 1978 and her pavilion is Pabellón Anaitasuna with capacity of 2,500 seaters.

== History ==
Former logo

Founded in 1978 in Irurtzun, Navarre, Xota started as an amateur team in the regional leagues.

In 1993, Xota promoted to the second division and in 1998 the club moved to Pamplona after the first division.

In May 2017, Xota signed a collaboration agreement with football club CA Osasuna, changing its name to Club Atlético Osasuna Xota.

== Sponsors ==
- Canteras Alaiz - (1993–94)
- Diario de Noticias - (1994–97)
- Industrias Carsal - (1996–98)
- MRA (Miguel Rico & Asociados) - (1997–10)
- Ingeteam - (1999–02)
- Gvtarra - (2002–06)
- Triman - (2010–13)
- Magnesitas Navarras - (2013–)
- Gurpea Mantenimiento y Montaje Industrial - (2014–)

== Season to season ==
Season	Tier	Division	Place	Notes
1989/90	2	1ª Nacional A	7th	
1990/91	3	1ª Nacional B	—	
1991/92	2	1ª Nacional A	4th	
1992/93	2	1ª Nacional A	6th	
1993/94	2	D. Plata	4th	
1994/95	2	D. Plata	2nd	
1995/96	2	D. Plata	2nd	
1996/97	2	D. Plata	3rd	
1997/98	2	D. Plata	1st	
1998/99	1	D. Honor	15th	
1999/00	1	D. Honor	10th	
2000/01	1	D. Honor	16th	
2001/02	1	D. Honor	5th	
2002/03	1	D. Honor	10th	
2003/04	1	D. Honor	12th	

Season	Tier	Division	Place	Notes
2004/05	1	D. Honor	6th	
2005/06	1	D. Honor	8th	
2006/07	1	D. Honor	5th	
2007/08	1	D. Honor	11th	
2008/09	1	D. Honor	8th	
2009/10	1	D. Honor	7th	
2010/11	1	D. Honor	8th	
2011/12	1	1ª División	6th / QF	
2012/13	1	1ª División	6th / QF	
2013/14	1	1ª División	5th / QF	
2014/15	1	1ª División	6th / QF	
2015/16	1	1ª División	6th / SF	
2016/17	1	1ª División		

- 19 seasons in Primera División
- 5 seasons in Segunda División
- 3 seasons in Segunda División B
- 1 seasons in Tercera División

== Current squad ==
As of 5 November 2024

Note: Flags indicate national team as defined under FIFA eligibility rules; some limited exceptions apply. Players may hold more than one non-FIFA nationality.

No.	Pos.	Nation	Player
1	Goalkeeper	(Spain) ESP	Asier Llamas
2	Winger	(Argentina) ARG	Andrés Geraghty
3	Defender	(Brazil) BRA	Juninho
4	Defender	(Spain) ESP	Toni Escribano
5	Winger	(Japan) JPN	Kokoro Harada
7	Winger	(Spain) ESP	Ion Cerviño
8	Defender	(Spain) ESP	Roberto Martil (captain)
9	Pivot	(Spain) ESP	Dani Saldise
10	Winger	(Spain) ESP	Pachu
11	Winger	(Brazil) BRA	Gabriel Ligeiro
13	Defender	(Ukraine) UKR	Ihor Korsun
20	Pivot	(Argentina) ARG	Panta
22	Winger	(Spain) ESP	Josu Mendive
97	Goalkeeper	(Spain) ESP	Alejandro Palazón
