= 1995–96 División de Honor de Futsal =

División de Honor
- Season: 1995–96
- Champions: Interviú Boomerang
- Relegated: Mejorada, At. Madrid/Leganés, La Massana & Ceuta Samsung
- European Championship: Interviú Boomerang
- Matches played: 380
- Biggest home win: Interviú Boomerang 14–2 La Massana
- Biggest away win: Sol Fuerza 3–11 Alcantarilla
- Highest scoring: Sol Fuerza 8–9 Interviú Boomerang

The 1995–96 season of the División de Honor de Futsal is the 7th season of top-tier futsal in Spain.

== Regular season ==
=== League table ===
Title Play-Off
Relegation

P	Team	Pld	W	D	L	GF	GA	Pts
1	Papeles Beltrán Alcantarilla	38	30	5	3	180	78	95
2	Interviú Boomerang	38	31	1	6	185	96	94
3	ElPozo Murcia	38	29	1	8	203	126	88
4	Pinturas Lepanto	38	26	3	9	168	115	81
5	Toledart	38	25	3	10	183	110	77
6	Playas de Castellón	38	23	7	8	181	113	76
7	Academia Postal	38	19	7	12	137	122	64
8	Caja Segovia	38	18	4	16	151	166	58
9	Industrias García	38	16	7	15	167	159	55
10	M.A. Astorga	38	16	5	17	155	144	53
11	Barcelona	38	14	4	20	141	153	46
12	Vijusa Valencia	38	12	7	19	127	164	43
13	Caja San Fernando Jerez	38	11	7	20	116	148	40
14	Maspalomas Palm Oasis	38	12	4	22	107	145	40
15	Sol Fuerza	38	11	5	22	141	196	38
16	Rías Baixas	38	9	10	19	110	137	37
17	Mejorada	38	9	7	22	122	176	34
18	Atl. Madrid Leganés	38	8	4	26	118	186	28
19	La Massana	38	5	6	27	116	199	21
20	Ceuta Samsung	38	6	3	29	107	182	21

*Papeles Beltrán Alcantarilla was dissolved at end of season.

== Playoffs ==
quarter-finals
P.B. Alcantarilla	2	12
Caja Segovia	1	5
P. Lepanto Zaragoza	2	3	4
Toledart	1	6	5
Interviú Boomerang	5	6
G. Academia Postal	1	3
ElPozo Murcia	4	4	5
Playas de Castellón	2	6	6

semifinals
P.B. Alcantarilla	2	1
Toledart	4	4
Interviú Boomerang	9	4
Playas de Castellón	4	2

final
Toledart	1	3	2
Interviú Boomerang	1	3	3

1995–96 División de Honor winners
(Community of Madrid)
Interviú Boomerang
Third title

== See also ==
- División de Honor de Futsal
- Futsal in Spain
