= Rugby Unión Xerez =

Spanish rugby union club, based in Jerez de la Frontera

CRUXE / RUX
- Full name: Club de Rugby Unión Xerez
- Nickname: Xerecistas
- Founded: 1992; 34 years ago
- President: Antoine Ortolan
Team kit

Club de Rugby Unión Xerez (CRUXE / RUX) is a rugby union team based in the city of Jerez de la Frontera in Andalusia (Spain). It was founded in 1992 and refounded in 2009. The team plays in Pradera Hípica de Chapín next to Estadio Municipal de Chapín.

== History ==
CRUXE was founded in 1992 and was re-founded in 2009. In the summer of 2015, Xerez Deportivo FC and CRUXE reached a collaboration agreement whereby both clubs belong to the same sports club (CRUXE DFC).

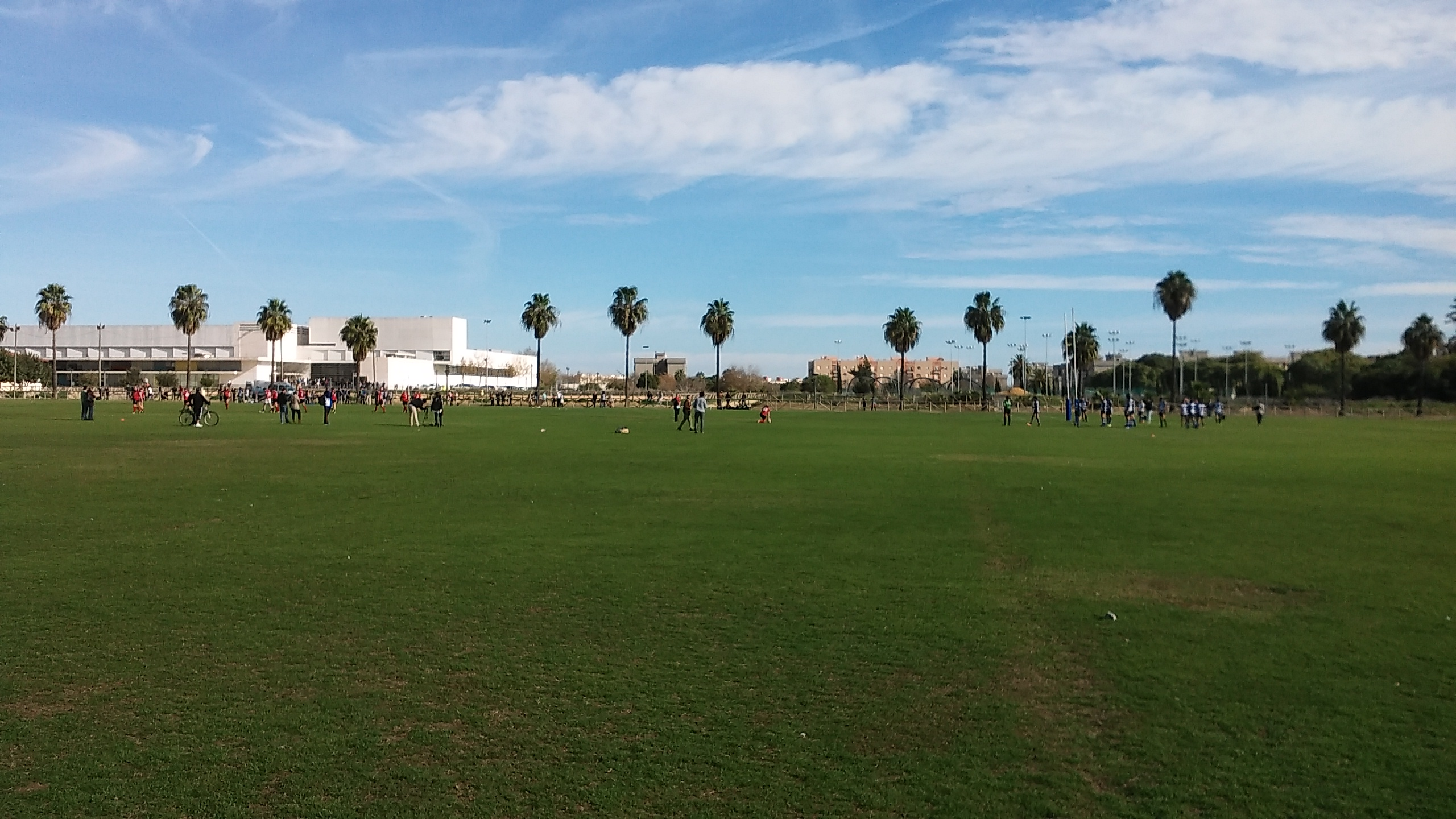
CRUXE playing a match un Pradera Hípica de Chapín

The team began playing in the Andalusian Second Division (Spanish regional league), playing its home games at the Pradera Hípica de Chapín. On February 28, CRUXE was defeated in the play-off for promotion to the Andalusian 1st Division after losing to Club de Nerja.

Later they would separate from Xerez Deportivo FC leaving CRUXE again which would merge with Rugby Union Xerez (RUX) to found the Club de Rugby Unión Xerez, which has categories from Under-6 to Under-18. Although he does not currently compete in any senior division.

== See also ==
- Rugby union in Spain
- Xerez Deportivo FC
- Xerez DFC Fútbol Sala
- Atletismo Chapín Xerez Deportivo FC
