= 1996–97 División de Honor de Futsal =

División de Honor
- Season: 1996–97
- Champions: Castilla La Mancha
- Relegated: Univ. Europea CEES
- European Championship: Castilla La Mancha
- Matches played: 240
- Biggest home win: Playas de Castellón 10–0 Ourense
- Biggest away win: Zaragoza 4–11 Industrias García
- Highest scoring: ElPozo Murcia 14–6 Sol Fuerza

The 1996–97 season of the División de Honor de Futsal was the 8th season of top-tier futsal in Spain.

== Regular season ==
=== League table ===
Title Play-Off
Relegation

P	Team	Pld	W	D	L	GF	GA	Pts
1	Playas de Castellón	30	24	3	3	152	73	75
2	Castilla La Mancha	30	21	2	7	151	96	65
3	Maspalomas Sol Europa	30	18	6	6	145	93	60
4	ElPozo Murcia	30	19	3	8	150	109	60
5	Industrias García	30	15	7	8	158	131	52
6	Barcelona	30	15	4	11	120	125	49
7	Boomerang Interviú	30	14	4	12	115	109	46
8	Ourense	30	14	4	12	103	113	46
9	Caja Segovia	30	11	3	16	117	128	36
10	Caja San Fernando	30	9	7	14	92	96	34
11	Astorga	30	10	3	17	128	147	33
12	Yumas Valencia	30	8	5	17	115	146	29
13	Zaragoza	30	8	5	17	89	137	29
14	Rías Baixas	30	6	6	18	59	102	24
15	Sol Fuerza	30	6	5	19	124	162	23
16	Univ. Europea CEES	30	5	7	18	103	154	22

== Playoffs ==
quarter-finals
Playas de Castellón	9	1	_
Ourense	1	1	_
ElPozo Murcia	3	9	8
Industrias García	4	1	4
CLM Talavera	1	5	4
Boomerang Interviú	6	1	2
Maspalomas Sol Europa	0	5	9
FC Barcelona	5	4	6

semifinals
Playas de Castellón	10	7	_
ElPozo Murcia	9	4	_
CLM Talavera	8	6	_
Maspalomas Sol Europa	5	2	_

final
Playas de Castellón	1	5	1
CLM Talavera	2	7	3

1996–97 División de Honor winners
(Castilla–La Mancha)
Castilla-La Mancha
Second title

== See also ==
- División de Honor de Futsal
- Futsal in Spain
