= Atletismo Chapín Xerez Deportivo FC =

Atletismo Chapín Xerez Deportivo FC is a track team from Jerez de la Frontera founded in 1989.

It stood out during the decade of the 2000s, when it won eight consecutive championships in Spain of Clubs, and four Spanish Cups, among other titles.

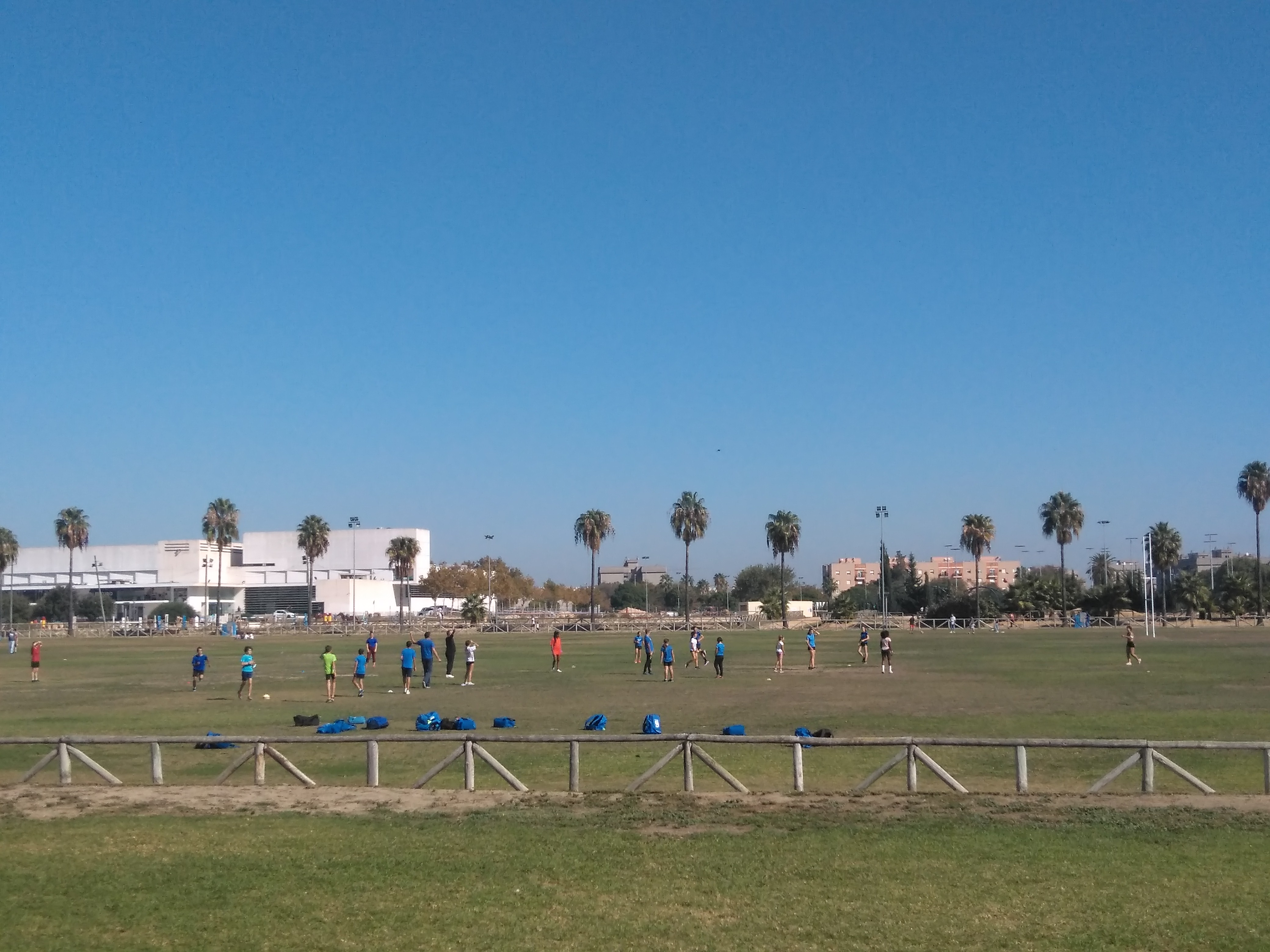
Training of young team

In 2014, the club reached a cooperation agreement to Xerez Deportivo FC to enter the sports association.

== Honours ==
- Spanish Championship

Winners (8): 2001, 2002, 2003, 2004, 2005, 2006, 2007, 2008

- Spanish Cups

Winners (4): 2002, 2003, 2004, 2006

== See also ==
- Xerez Deportivo FC
- Xerez DFC Fútbol Sala
- Club de Rugby Xerez Deportivo FC
