= 2003–04 División de Honor de Futsal =

División de Honor
- Season: 2003–04
- Champions: Boomerang Interviú
- Relegated: Guadalajara & Valencia
- UEFA Futsal Cup: Boomerang Interviú
- Matches: 240
- Goals: 1,992 (8.3 per match)
- Top goalscorer: Lenísio, 57 goals
- Biggest home win: ElPozo Murcia 12–0 Gestesa Guadalajara
- Biggest away win: DKV Seguros Zaragoza 2–11 ElPozo Murcia
- Highest scoring: DKV Seguros Zaragoza 11–5 Miró Martorell

The 2003–04 season of the División de Honor de Futsal is the 15th season of top-tier futsal in Spain.

== Regular season ==
=== League table ===
Pos	Team	Pld	W	D	L	GF	GA	GD	Pts	Qualification or relegation
1	Boomerang Interviú	30	24	4	2	163	90	+73	76	Title Play-Off
2	ElPozo Murcia Turística	30	23	1	6	174	92	+82	70	Title Play-Off
3	Playas de Castellón	30	17	7	6	128	90	+38	58	Title Play-Off
4	Miró Martorell	30	17	4	9	134	104	+30	55	Title Play-Off
5	Polaris World Cartagena	30	13	8	9	122	116	+6	47	Title Play-Off
6	DKV Seguros Zaragoza	30	14	3	13	117	124	−7	45	Title Play-Off
7	Azkar Lugo	30	12	7	11	106	100	+6	43	Title Play-Off
8	Marfil Santa Coloma	30	13	3	14	111	113	−2	42	Title Play-Off
9	Caja Segovia	30	10	6	14	114	133	−19	36	
10	Lobelle de Santiago	30	9	8	13	139	133	+6	35	
11	Gervasport Boadilla	30	10	5	15	118	133	−15	35	
12	MRA Gvtarra	30	10	5	15	126	143	−17	35	
13	PSG Móstoles	30	10	4	16	119	142	−23	34	
14	LookFind Alcalá Carnicer	30	9	5	16	123	154	−31	32	Relegation play-off
15	Gestesa Guadalajara	30	6	3	21	106	169	−63	21	Relegation
16	Valencia Vijusa	30	6	1	23	92	156	−64	19	Relegation

== Playoffs ==
=== Championships playoffs ===
quarter-finals
Marfil Santa Coloma	2	1	_
Boomerang Interviú	5	5	_
Polaris World Cartagena	4	7	_
Miró Martorell	3	6	_
Azkar Lugo	1	2	_
ElPozo Murcia Turística	4	5	_
DKV Seguros Zaragoza	1	2	_
Playas de Castellón	7	7	_

semifinals
Boomerang Interviú	9	3	1	6
Polaris World Cartagena	2	6	0	3
ElPozo Murcia Turística	5	5	4	4
Playas de Castellón	4	7	3	2

final
Boomerang Interviú	4	5	9	3	7
ElPozo Murcia Turística	7	4	1	4	4

2003–04 División de Honor winners
(Community of Madrid)
Boomerang Interviú
Sixth title

=== Relegation playoff ===
relegation playoff
LookFind Alcalá Carnicer	3	6	5	7
Levitt Las Rozas	7	4	4	4

- LookFind Alcalá Carnicer remained in División de Honor.

== Goalscorers ==
Position	Player	Club	Goals
1	(Brazil) Lenísio	ElPozo Murcia	57
2	Guga	Carnicer	41
3	(Spain) Cogorro	Boadilla	37
3	(Spain) Javi Rodríguez	Playas Castellón	37
3	(Brazil) Manoel Tobías	Cartagena	37

== See also ==
- División de Honor de Futsal
- Futsal in Spain
