= 2008–09 División de Honor de Futsal =

División de Honor
- Season: 2008–09
- Champions: ElPozo Murcia Turística
- Relegated: Fisiomedia Manacor
- UEFA Futsal Cup: ElPozo Murcia Turística
- Matches played: 210
- Goals scored: 1,339 (6.38 per match)
- Top goalscorer: Wilde, 35 goals
- Biggest home win: Tien21 P. Millenium Pinto 10–2 Marfil Santa Coloma
- Biggest away win: Fisiomedia Manacor 0–7 Barcelona Mobicat
- Highest scoring: Fisiomedia Manacor 6–10 MRA Navarra

The 2008–09 season of the División de Honor de Futsal is the 20th season of top-tier futsal in Spain.

== Regular season table ==
Title Play-Off
Relegation

P	Team	Pld	W	D	L	GF	GA	Pts
1	ElPozo Murcia Turística	28	20	5	3	120	76	65
2	Inter Movistar	28	18	6	4	108	71	60
3	Barcelona Mobicat	28	16	5	7	92	56	53
4	Lobelle de Santiago	28	14	5	9	99	90	47
5	Benicarló Aeroport Castelló	28	13	6	9	72	62	45
6	Tien21 P. Millenium Pinto	28	15	0	13	93	90	45
7	Caja Segovia	28	13	4	11	90	72	43
8	MRA Navarra	28	11	5	12	91	88	38
9	Azkar Lugo	28	11	4	13	80	95	37
10	Futsal Cartagena	28	10	6	12	93	97	36
11	Carnicer Torrejón	28	9	2	17	97	115	29
12	Playas de Castellón	28	8	4	16	65	94	28
13	Gestesa Guadalajara	28	8	3	17	85	104	27
14	Marfil Santa Coloma	28	6	6	16	71	101	24
15	Fisiomedia Manacor	28	6	3	19	83	128	21

== Championship playoffs ==
quarter-finals
Tien21 P. Millenium Pinto	6	4	_
Barcelona Mobicat	4	2	_
Caja Segovia	3 (6)	2	3 (4)
Inter Movistar	3 (5)	4	3 (5)
Benicarló Aeroport Castelló	1	4	2
Lobelle de Santiago	3	3	5
MRA Navarra	3	2	_
ElPozo Murcia Turística	8	6	_

semifinals
Tien21 P. Millenium Pinto	5	2	3
Inter Movistar	6	1	4
Lobelle de Santiago	3	5	_
ElPozo Murcia Turística	4	8	_

final
Inter Movistar	2	2
ElPozo Murcia Turística	3	7

2008–09 División de Honor winners
(Region of Murcia)
ElPozo Murcia Turística
Fourth title

The Finals were broadcast in Spain on RTVE.

=== Matches ===
2008–09 Championship playoffs matches

==== Quarter-finals ====
(8) MRA Navarra vs. (1) ElPozo Murcia Turística:

- Game 1 15 May @ Pamplona: MRA Navarra 3-8 ElPozo Murcia Turística
- Game 2 22 May @ Murcia: ElPozo Murcia Turística 6-2 MRA Navarra

ElPozo Murcia Turística wins the series 2–0

- Total Aggregate: 5–14

(7) Caja Segovia vs. (2) Interviú Movistar:

- Game 1 16 May @ Segovia: Caja Segovia 3-3 Interviú Movistar / Pen:6–5
- Game 2 23 May @ Alcalá de Henares: Interviú Movistar 4-2 Caja Segovia
- Game 3 24 May @ Alcalá de Henares: Interviú Movistar 3-3 Caja Segovia / Pen:5–4

Interviú Movistar wins the series 2–1

- Total Aggregate: 8–10

(6) Tien21 P. Millenium Pinto vs. (3) FC Barcelona Mobicat:

- Game 1 17 May @ Pinto: Tien21 P. Millenium Pinto 6-4 FC Barcelona Mobicat
- Game 2 22 May @ Barcelona: FC Barcelona Mobicat 2-4 Tien21 P. Millenium Pinto

Tien21 P. Millenium Pinto wins the series 2–0

- Total Aggregate: 10–6

(5) Benicarló Aeroport Castelló vs. (4) Lobelle de Santiago:

- Game 1 15 May @ Benicarló: Benicarló Aeroport Castelló 1-3 Lobelle de Santiago
- Game 2 22 May @ Santiago de Compostela: Lobelle de Santiago 3-4 Benicarló Aeroport Castelló
- Game 3 23 May @ Santiago de Compostela: Lobelle de Santiago 5-2 Benicarló Aeroport Castelló

Lobelle de Santiago wins the series 2–1

- Total Aggregate: 7–11

==== Semifinals ====
(4) Lobelle de Santiago vs. (1) ElPozo Murcia Turística:

- Game 1 30 May @ Santiago de Compostela: Lobelle de Santiago 3-4 ElPozo Murcia Turística
- Game 2 5 June @ Murcia: ElPozo Murcia Turística 8-5 Lobelle de Santiago

ElPozo Murcia Turística wins the series 1–0

- Total Aggregate: 8–12

(6) Tien21 P. Millenium Pinto vs. (2) Interviú Movistar:

- Game 1 29 May @ Pinto: Tien21 P. Millenium Pinto 5-6 Interviú Movistar
- Game 2 5 June @ Alcalá de Henares: Interviú Movistar 1-2 Tien21 P. Millenium Pinto
- Game 3 6 June @ Alcalá de Henares: Interviú Movistar 4-3 Tien21 P. Millenium Pinto

Interviú Movistar wins the series 2–1

- Total Aggregate: 10–11

==== Final ====
(2) Interviú Movistar vs. (1) ElPozo Murcia Turística:

- Game 1 12 June @ Alcalá de Henares: Interviú Movistar 2-3 ElPozo Murcia Turística
- Game 2 19 June @ Murcia: ElPozo Murcia Turística 7-2 Interviú Movistar

ElPozo Murcia Turística wins the series 2–0

- Total Aggregate: 4–10

CHAMPION: : ElPozo Murcia Turística

== Top goal scorers ==
- As day 30 of 30

Player	Goals	Team
Wilde	35	ElPozo Murcia Turística
Fernandinho	34	Azkar Lugo
Schumacher	32	Inter Movistar
Fernandao	31	FC Barcelona Mobicat
Jaison	29	Carnicer Torrejón
Cogorro	27	Gestesa Guadalajara
Carlinhos	23	Lobelle de Santiago
Charlie	23	Gestesa Guadalajara
Héctor	21	Marfil Santa Coloma
Vinicius	21	ElPozo Murcia Turística

== TV Coverage ==
- TVE2
- Teledeporte
- Barça TV
- Punt 2
- Canal 33
- TVG

== See also ==
- 2008–09 División de Plata de Futsal
- División de Honor de Futsal
- Futsal in Spain
