= 2001–02 División de Honor de Futsal =

División de Honor
- Season: 2001–02
- Champions: Antena3 Boomerang
- Relegated: Forum Ourense & Andorra
- UEFA Futsal Cup: Antena3 Boomerang
- Matches played: 240
- Goals scored: 1,914 (7.98 per match)
- Top goalscorer: Daniel Ibañes, 48 goals
- Biggest home win: Playas de Castellón 14–2 O'Parrulo
- Biggest away win: Atlético Boadilla 2–8 Valencia Vijusa
- Highest scoring: Miro Martorell 12–6 Playas de Castellón

The 2001–02 season of the División de Honor de Futsal is the 13th season of top-tier futsal in Spain.

== Regular season ==
=== League table ===
Title Play-Off
Relegation

P	Team	Pld	W	D	L	GF	GA	Pts
1	ElPozo Murcia	30	25	2	3	169	104	77
2	Playas de Castellón	30	21	5	4	162	95	68
3	Miró Martorell	30	20	7	3	149	96	67
4	Antena3 Boomerang	30	15	6	9	109	76	51
5	MRA Ingeteam Xota	30	13	6	11	112	115	45
6	Valencia Vijusa	30	12	8	10	129	119	44
7	Caja Segovia	30	13	4	13	132	128	43
8	Atl. Boadilla	30	11	4	15	110	138	37
9	GMI Polaris Cartagena	30	10	6	14	118	128	36
10	Marfil Alella	30	9	7	14	115	140	34
11	Fiat Autoexpert	30	9	7	14	106	127	34
12	FC Barcelona	30	11	0	19	108	135	33
13	LocaliaTV Móstoles	30	7	10	13	112	124	31
14	O Parrulo Ferrol	30	8	3	19	84	125	27
15	Forum Ourense	30	8	2	20	104	126	26
16	Andorra	30	7	5	18	95	138	26

== Playoffs ==
quarter-finals
MRA Ingeteam Xota	5 (2)	1	4
Antena3 Boomerang	5 (1)	5	9
Atl. Boadilla	3	4	_
ElPozo Murcia	6	7	_
Caja Segovia	4	5	5
Playas de Castellón	5	4	3
Valencia Vijusa	1	5	4
Miró Martorell	5	4	5

semifinals
Antena3 Boomerang	6	7	_
ElPozo Murcia	4	3	_
Caja Segovia	5	2	3
Miró Martorell	4	8	6

final
Antena3 Boomerang	5	5	3	5	_
Miró Martorell	4	4	7	3	_

2001–02 División de Honor winners
(Community of Madrid)
Antena3 Boomerang
Fourth title

== Goalscorers ==
- As day 30 of 30

Player	Goals	Team
Daniel	48	Caja Segovia
Joan	46	Playas de Castellón
Paulo Roberto	42	ElPozo Murcia
Marcelo	41	Marfil Alella
Kike	35	ElPozo Murcia
Tete	31	Valencia Vijusa
Cogorro	30	Atl. Boadilla
Edesio	30	GMI Polaris Cartagena
Vander Carioca	30	Playas de Castellón
Javi Limones	28	ElPozo Murcia

== See also ==
- División de Honor de Futsal
- Futsal in Spain
