= 2004–05 División de Honor de Futsal =

División de Honor
- Season: 2004–05
- Champions: Boomerang Interviú
- Relegated: Boadilla Las Rozas & Marfil Santa Coloma
- UEFA Futsal Cup: Boomerang Interviú
- Matches played: 240
- Goals scored: 1,921 (8 per match)
- Top goalscorer: Lenísio, 52 goals
- Biggest home win: Barcel Euro Puebla 9–1 MRA Gvatarra
- Biggest away win: Azkar Lugo 2–9 ElPozo Murcia Turística
- Highest scoring: Miró Martorell 7–8 ElPozo Murcia Turística

The 2004–05 season of the División de Honor de Futsal is the 16th season of top-tier futsal in Spain.

== Regular season ==
=== League table ===
Pos	Team	Pld	W	D	L	GF	GA	GD	Pts	Qualification or relegation
1	ElPozo Murcia Turística	30	23	4	3	175	107	+68	73	Title Play-Off
2	Boomerang Interviú	30	21	4	5	140	99	+41	67	Title Play-Off
3	Playas de Castellón	30	18	5	7	146	104	+42	59	Title Play-Off
4	Polaris World Cartagena	30	16	9	5	124	83	+41	57	Title Play-Off
5	Benicarló	30	14	4	12	118	119	−1	46	Title Play-Off
6	MRA Gvtarra	30	12	7	11	118	116	+2	43	Title Play-Off
7	Lobelle de Santiago	30	12	5	13	114	114	0	41	Title Play-Off
8	DKV Seguros Zaragoza	30	11	8	11	118	134	−16	41	Title Play-Off
9	Miró Martorell	30	11	7	12	127	131	−4	40	
10	Azkar Lugo	30	13	1	16	106	116	−10	40	
11	Fiat Autoexpert Torrejón	30	10	4	16	123	127	−4	34	
12	Caja Segovia	30	9	7	14	98	125	−27	34	
13	Barcel Euro Puebla	30	8	8	14	117	135	−18	32	
14	PSG Móstoles	30	8	5	17	103	122	−19	29	Relegation play-off
15	Boadilla Las Rozas	30	7	5	18	111	129	−18	26	Relegation
16	Marfil Santa Coloma	30	4	3	23	83	163	−80	15	Relegation

== Playoffs ==
=== Championship playoffs ===
quarter-finals
Lobelle de Santiago	3	2	_
Boomerang Interviú	5	5	_
MRA Gvtarra	6	3	_
Playas de Castellón	1	2	_
DKV Seguros Zaragoza	3	2	_
ElPozo Murcia Turística	5	6	_
Benicarló	4	3	_
Polaris World Cartagena	5	8	_

semifinals
ElPozo Murcia Turística	8	4	8
Polaris World Cartagena	5	3	7
Boomerang Interviú	2	5	2	3	4
MRA Gvtarra	3	4	3	1	3

final
ElPozo Murcia Turística	5	4	5	3	_
Boomerang Interviú	6	3	7	6	_

2004–05 División de Honor winners
(Community of Madrid)
Boomerang Interviú
Seventh title

The Finals were broadcast in Spain on TVE2 and Teledeporte.

=== Relegation playoff ===
relegation playoff
PSG Móstoles	5	4	15	6	_
Gestesa Guadalajara	6	3	7	4	_

- PSG Móstoles remained in División de Honor.

== See also ==
- División de Honor de Futsal
- Futsal in Spain
