= 2002–03 División de Honor de Futsal =

División de Honor
- Season: 2002–03
- Champions: Interviú
- Relegated: Barcelona & Ferrol
- UEFA Futsal Cup: Interviú
- Matches played: 240
- Goals scored: 1,925 (8.02 per match)
- Top goalscorer: Paulo Roberto, 51 goals
- Biggest home win: ElPozo Murcia 12–0 Forum Ferrol
- Biggest away win: URJC Móstoles 2–11 ElPozo Murcia
- Highest scoring: Gervasport Boadilla 10–8 FC Barcelona

The 2002–03 season of the División de Honor de Futsal is the 14th season of top-tier futsal in Spain.

== Regular season ==
=== League table ===
Title Play-Off
Relegation

P	Team	Pld	W	D	L	GF	GA	Pts
1	Interviú Boomerang	30	20	5	5	163	88	65
2	ElPozo Murcia	30	19	8	3	171	106	65
3	Miró Martorell	30	17	3	10	119	106	54
4	Playas de Castellón	30	16	4	10	144	117	52
5	DKV Seguros Zaragoza	30	15	5	10	136	123	50
6	Gervasport Boadilla	30	15	2	13	137	113	47
7	Caja Segovia	30	13	7	10	106	96	46
8	Valencia Vijusa	30	13	7	10	101	98	46
9	URJC Móstoles	30	14	4	12	120	119	46
10	MRA Gvtarra	30	13	7	10	138	114	46
11	Azkar Lugo	30	11	1	18	92	140	34
12	'Marfil Santa Coloma	30	8	7	15	114	135	31
13	Carnicer Autoexpert	30	8	7	15	121	144	31
14	Polaris World Cartagena	30	7	9	14	107	137	30
15	FC Barcelona	30	8	5	17	103	139	29
16	Forum Ferrol	30	1	3	26	53	150	6

== Playoffs ==
quarter-finals
Valencia Vijusa	5	2	_
Boomerang Interviú	6	10	_
DKV Seguros Zaragoza	4	2	1
Playas de Castellón	2	4	7
Caja Segovia	2	7	5
ElPozo Murcia	5	6	6
Gervasport Boadilla	3	1	2
Miró Martorell	0	2	4

semifinals
Boomerang Interviú	7	7	9
Playas de Castellón	3	3	2
ElPozo Murcia	3	3	4	4	4
Miró Martorell	2	4	3	7	2

final
Boomerang Interviú	3	4	6	2	3
ElPozo Murcia	4	2	2	3	2

2002–03 División de Honor winners
(Community of Madrid)
Boomerang Interviú
Fifth title

== Goalscorers ==
Position	Player	Club	Goals
1	(Spain) Paulo Roberto	ElPozo Murcia	51
2	(Brazil) Lenísio	ElPozo Murcia	47
3	(Spain) Joan	Interviú	40
4	(Brazil) Marques	Azkar Lugo	38
5	(Brazil) Vander Carioca	Playas	37

== See also ==
- División de Honor de Futsal
- Futsal in Spain
