= UD Las Rozas Boadilla =

Spanish futsal club

Boadilla Las Rozas
- Full name: Unión Deportiva Boadilla Las Rozas
- Nickname: --
- Founded: 2004
- Ground: Pabellón Municipal, Boadilla del Monte, Community of Madrid, Spain
- Capacity: 1,000
- Manager: Gabriel Hernández
- League: 3ª División – Group 3
- 2014–15: 3ª División – Group 4, 4th
Home colours	Away colours	Third colours

Unión Deportiva Boadilla Las Rozas is a futsal club based in Las Rozas–Boadilla del Monte in Spain. Its home games are held in Pabellón Municipal, which has a capacity of 1,000 seats.

== History ==
The club was founded in 2004 through a merger of Atlético Boadilla FS and CFS Las Rozas, taking the place of Atlético Boadilla in División de Honor. Las Rozas finished the 2004–05 season in 15th position, and was relegated to Division de Plata. In 2008, the club was forced to play in Primera Nacional A, due to economic limitations. In 2009, they reached an agreement with Ciudad de Móstoles FS to play home matches in Móstoles, playing as Boadilla Las Rozas/Móstoles Mirasierra. The partnership agreement ended in the summer 2011.

For the 2011–12 season, UD Las Rozas Boadilla did not play with a first team, playing only with youth teams. The club returned for the 2012–13 season with a first team in Tercera División.

== Season to season ==
Season	Tier	Division	Place	Notes
2004/05	1	D. Honor	15th	
2005/06	2	D. Plata	4th	
2006/07	2	D. Plata	6th	
2007/08	2	D. Plata	3rd	
2008/09	3	1ª Nacional A	5th	
2009/10	3	1ª Nacional A	2nd	
2010/11	3	1ª Nacional A	1st	
2011/12	—	DNP	—	
2012/13	4	3ª División	7th	
2013/14	4	3ª División	—	
2014/15	4	3ª División	4th	
2015/16	4	3ª División	—	

- 1 seasons in Primera División
- 3 seasons in Segunda División
- 3 seasons in Segunda División B

== Notable players ==
- (Spain) Sergio Lozano
- (Spain) Carlos Ortiz
