= FS Baix Maestrat =

Spanish futsal club

Benicarló
- Full name: Fútbol Sala Baix Maestrat
- Nickname(s): --
- Founded: 1996
- Dissolved: February, 2012
- Ground: Pabellón Municipal, Benicarló, Valencian Community, Spain
- Capacity: 2,000
- 2011–12: Primera División, withdrawn
Home colours	Away colours

Fútbol Sala Baix Maestrat was a futsal club based in Benicarló, city of the province of Castellón in the autonomous community of Valencian Community.

The club was founded in 1996 and its pavilion was Municipal de Benicarló with capacity of 2,000 seaters.

The club was sponsored ultimately by Ayuntamiento de Benicarló and Aeroport Castelló.

== History ==
The club was disbanded in February 2012, due to large amounts of embargoes sustained and the impossibility to raise funds.

== Sponsors ==
- Proyastec – 1999–2000
- Povet.com – 2000–2004
- Ayuntamiento de Benicarló – 2004–2005
- Grupo Poblet – 2005–2006
- Onda Urbana – 2006–2007
- Ayuntamiento de Benicarló – 2007–2008
- Aeroport Castelló – 2008–2011

== Season to season ==
Season	Division	Place	Copa de España
1996–97	1ª Nacional A	7th	
1997–98	1ª Nacional A	4th	
1998–99	1ª Nacional A	2nd	
1999–00	D. Plata	5th	
2000–01	D. Plata	4th	
2001–02	D. Plata	1st	
2002–03	D. Plata	1st	
2003–04	D. Plata	1st	

Season	Division	Place	Copa de España
2004–05	D. Honor	5th	
2005–06	D. Honor	14th	
2006–07	D. Honor	4th	
2007–08	D. Honor	3rd	
2008–09	D. Honor	5th	
2009–10	D. Honor	14th	
2010–11	D. Honor	7th	
2011–12	1ª División	W	

- 7 seasons in Primera División
- 5 seasons in Segunda División
- 3 seasons in Segunda División B

== Last squad 2011/12 ==
No.	Player	Full name	Pos.	Nat.
1	Gus	Gustavo Pérez Segura	Goalkeeper	(Spain)
15	Iván	Iván Reverter Mercader	Goalkeeper	(Spain)
24	Aitor	Aitor Ortega Pérez	Goalkeeper	(Spain)
4	Vadillo	Antonio Vadillo Sánchez	Cierre	(Spain)
6	Hugo	Hugo Sánchez Flores	Ala	(Spain)
7	Raúl Manjón	Raúl Manjón López	Ala	(Spain)
8	Lolo	Manuel Urbano Cañete	Ala	(Spain)
10	Javi Alonso	Javier Alonso Giménez	Ala	(Spain)
14	Víctor	Víctor López Real	Ala	(Spain)
19	Simón	Simón Guerrero Cánovas	Ala	(Spain)
11	Gonzalo	Gonzalo Galán Carsí	Pivot	(Spain)
12	Chino	Aitor Donoso Cabañas	Pivot	(Spain)
16	Juan Carlos	Juan Carlos Sánchez Colchón	Pivot	(Spain)
17	Álvaro	Álvaro Macías Barrera	Pivot	(Spain)
18	Messias	Manoel Messias Xavier de Paiva	Pivot	(Brazil)
