= LNFS =

Liga Nacional de Fútbol Sala
- Abbreviation: LFP
- Type: Sports association
- Headquarters: Madrid, Spain
- Region served: Spain
- President: Javier Lozano Cid
- Main organ: General Assembly
- Website: www.lnfs.es

The Liga Nacional de Fútbol Sala (LNFS) (National Futsal League) is the governing body that runs the major professional futsal leagues in Spain. It was founded in 1989 and serves under the authority of the Royal Spanish Football Federation.

== Competitions ==
=== Men ===
- Primera División de Futsal
- Segunda División de Futsal
- Copa de España de Futsal
- Supercopa de España de Futsal

=== Women ===
- Primera División Femenina de Futsal
- Copa Femenina de Futsal

== Footballs ==
Joma currently provide the official ball of the LNFS and is used by all teams.

== President ==
Javier Lozano Cid is the current president of the LNFS.

== See also ==
- Spanish futsal league system
- Royal Spanish Football Federation
