= FS Cartagena =

Spanish futsal club

Jimbee Cartagena
- Full name: Futsal Cartagena
- Founded: 1993
- Ground: Palacio de los Deportes, Cartagena, Spain
- Capacity: 5,162
- Coach: (Brazil) Duda
- League: Primera División
- 2023–24: Regular season: 5th of 16; Playoffs: Champions
- Website: https://jimbeecartagena.com/
Home colours	Away colours

Polaris World Cartagena logo

Futsal Cartagena, also known as Jimbee Cartagena for sponsorship reasons, is a futsal club based in Cartagena, a city in the autonomous community of Region of Murcia.

The club was founded in 1993 and held its home matches in Palacio de los Deportes, which has a capacity of 5162 persons.

== History ==
Fútbol Sala Cartagena was founded in 1993 as Mínguez Sáez Cartagena.

=== Peinsa sponsorship fall ===
The club was sponsored for Peinsa until January, 2009. Peinsa was a company dedicated to housings promotions that in January went bankrupt. Due to this, the company was forced to leave as the sponsorship of Futsal Cartagena. In February, the club signed a new sponsorship contract with Centro Médico Virgen de la Caridad, a private health center from Cartagena, for ensure the future of club.

In mid of July, Futsal Cartagena sign a new sponsorship contract with Reale, an Italian insurance company.

The club was disbanded in July 2014 due to large debts incurred from past seasons. A new futsal team was created in the city, Cartagena Fútbol Sala, taking the FS Cartagena spot in Segunda División.

== Honours ==
=== National competitions ===
- Primera División: 2
  - 2023–24, 2024–25
- Supercopa de España: 1
  - 2024, 2025 and 2026

== Season to season ==
Season	Tier	Division	Place	Notes
1993/94	3	1ª Nacional A	–	
1994/95	3	1ª Nacional A	–	
1995/96	2	D. Plata	5th	
1996/97	2	D. Plata	3rd	
1997/98	2	D. Plata	1st	
1998/99	1	D. Honor	14th	
1999/00	1	D. Honor	9th	
2000/01	1	D. Honor	11th	
2001/02	1	D. Honor	9th	
2002/03	1	D. Honor	14th	
2003/04	1	D. Honor	5th	

Season	Tier	Division	Place	Notes
2004/05	1	D. Honor	4th	
2005/06	1	D. Honor	3rd	
2006/07	1	D. Honor	2nd	
2007/08	1	D. Honor	12th	
2008/09	1	D. Honor	10th	
2009/10	1	D. Honor	12th	
2010/11	1	D. Honor	13th	
2011/12	1	1ª División	15th	
2012/13	2	2ª División	12th	
2013/14	2	2ª División	5th / SF	

- 22 seasons in Primera División
- 7 seasons in Segunda División
- 2 seasons in Segunda División B

== Current squad ==
As of 5 November 2024

Note: Flags indicate national team as defined under FIFA eligibility rules; some limited exceptions apply. Players may hold more than one non-FIFA nationality.

No.	Pos.	Nation	Player
1	Goalkeeper	ESP	Chemi
7	Winger	BRA	Jhonatan Linhares
8	Defender	ESP	Tomaz Braga
9	Pivot	ESP	Pablo Ramírez
10	Winger	ESP	Francisco Cortés
11	Pivot	BRA	Waltinho
13	Winger	ESP	Miguel Mellado
14	Winger	ITA	Gabriel Motta
15	Goalkeeper	ESP	Ginés Gabarrón
17	Winger	ESP	Gon Castejón
19	Defender	ESP	Jesús Izquierdo (captain)
20	Pivot	THA	Muhammad Osamanmusa
22	Goalkeeper	ESP	Chispi
23	Defender	ESP	Darío Gil
93	Defender	FRA	Souheil Mouhoudine

== Notable players ==
- (Spain) Jordi Torras
- (Spain) Sergio Lozano
- (Spain) Cristian Domínguez
- (Brazil) Manoel Tobias
- (Brazil) Leandro Simi
- (Brazil) Lenísio
- (Brazil) Franklin Roosevelt
- (Brazil) Rafael França
- (Brazil) Ciço
