= Inter FS =

Spanish futsal club

Inter Movistar FS
- Full name: Inter Fútbol Sala
- Nickname: La Máquina Verde (The Green Machine)
- Founded: 1977; 49 years ago
- Ground: Pabellón Jorge Garbajosa
- Capacity: 3,136
- Chairman: José Manuel Saorín
- Coach: Alberto Riquer
- League: Primera División
- 2026–27: TBD
- Website: https://www.intermovistar.com/
Home colours	Away colours

Inter Fútbol Sala, known as Inter Movistar Fútbol Sala for sponsorship reasons, is a professional futsal club based in Torrejón de Ardoz, Madrid. The club was founded in 1977 and its pavilion is the Pabellón Jorge Garbajosa with a capacity of 3,136 seated spectators. The club's main sponsors is Movistar.

== History ==
Inter FS was founded in 1977 as Hora XXV. The team played charity matches with players like Amancio, Adelardo and López Ufarte. In 1979, the team played its first futsal championship as Interviú Hora XVV. In the following years, Inter won several league titles and cups.

In 1989 the Spanish Football Federation and the Association of Soccer unified their championships, creating the LNFS. Inter was one of its founding members, and in the inaugural season, Inter won the league and cup double. Two years later, Inter won the Futsal European Clubs Championship. In the following years the club maintained a good level, but the tough competition did not let them win the league again until 1996.

From 2002 until 2005, Inter won four consecutive league titles and became one of the dominant clubs in the national championship. In recognition, the Government of Spain granted the institution Plate Gold Royal Order of Sports Merit in 2006.

Inter won five league titles in a row starting in the 2013–14 season, for its thirteenth league title overall in the 2017–18 season. Inter also won the UEFA Futsal Cup in 2018, for its fifth title overall.

=== Locations ===
During its entire history, Inter FS has played in several locations in the Community of Madrid.

- 1977–1991: Pabellón Antonio Magariños (Madrid)
- 1991–1996: Polideportivo Municipal (Alcobendas)
- 1996–2004: Pabellón Parque Corredor (Torrejón de Ardoz)
- 2004–2015: Pabellón Fundación Montemadrid (Alcalá de Henares)
- 2015–present: Pabellón Jorge Garbajosa (Torrejón de Ardoz)

=== Club names ===
- 1977–1979: Hora XXV
- 1979–1981: Interviú Hora XXV
- 1981–1991: Interviú Lloyd's
- 1991–1996: Interviú Boomerang
- 1996–1999: Boomerang Interviú
- 1999–2000: Airtel Boomerang
- 2000–2002: Antena3 Boomerang
- 2002–2007: Boomerang Interviú
- 2007–2008: Interviú Fadesa
- 2008–present: Inter Movistar

== Current squad ==
As of 1 July 2026

Note: Flags indicate national team as defined under FIFA eligibility rules; some limited exceptions apply. Players may hold more than one non-FIFA nationality.

No.	Pos.	Nation	Player

== Season to season ==
Season	Tier	Division	Place	Notes
1989–90	1	D. Honor	1st	
1990–91	1	D. Honor	2nd	
1991–92	1	D. Honor	1st	
1992–93	1	D. Honor	1st	
1993–94	1	D. Honor	1st	
1994–95	1	D. Honor	5th	
1995–96	1	D. Honor	2nd	
1996–97	1	D. Honor	7th	
1997–98	1	D. Honor	3rd	
1998–99	1	D. Honor	4th	
1999–2000	1	D. Honor	5th	
2000–01	1	D. Honor	4th	
2001–02	1	D. Honor	4th	
2002–03	1	D. Honor	1st	
2003–04	1	D. Honor	1st	

Season	Tier	Division	Place	Notes
2004–05	1	D. Honor	2nd	
2005–06	1	D. Honor	2nd	
2006–07	1	D. Honor	1st	
2007–08	1	D. Honor	2nd	
2008–09	1	D. Honor	2nd	
2009–10	1	D. Honor	2nd	
2010–11	1	D. Honor	3rd	
2011–12	1	1ª División	3rd / SF	
2012–13	1	1ª División	3rd / SF	
2013–14	1	1ª División	1st / W	
2014–15	1	1ª División	1st / W	
2015–16	1	1ª División	1st / W	
2016–17	1	1ª División	1st / W	
2017–18	1	1ª División	1st / W	
2018–19	1	1ª División	4th / QF	

Season	Tier	Division	Place	Notes
2019–20	1	1ª División	1st / W	
2020–21	1	1ª División	6th / QF	
2021–22	1	1ª División	2nd / QF	
2022–23	1	1ª División	6th / SF	
2023–24	1	1ª División	4th / QF	
2024–25	1	1ª División	/	
2025–26	1	1ª División	/	
2026–27	1	1ª División	/	

- 38 seasons in Primera División

== European competitions record ==
Last update: 1 July 2026

UEFA competitions
Competition	Appearances	Played	Won	Drawn	Lost	Goals For	Goals Against	Last season played
UEFA Futsal Cup	13	74	63	2	9	412	125	2020-2021
European Futsal Cup Winners Cup	1	4	4	0	0	-	-	2007/2008
Total	14	78	67	2	9	412	125	

== Club honours ==
=== National competitions ===
- Primera División (14): 1989–90, 1990–91, 1995–96, 2001–02, 2002–03, 2003–04, 2004–05, 2007–08, 2013–14, 2014–15, 2015–16, 2016–17, 2017–18, 2019–20
- Copa de España (11): 1990, 1996, 2001, 2004, 2005, 2007, 2009, 2014, 2016, 2017, 2021
- Copa del Rey (3): 2014–15, 2020–21, 2024–25
- Supercopa de España (14): 1990, 1991, 1996, 2001, 2002, 2003, 2005, 2007, 2008, 2011, 2015, 2017, 2018, 2020
- Liga FEFS (9): 1979–80, 1980–81, 1981–82, 1983–84, 1984–85, 1985–86, 1986–87, 1987–88, 1988–89
- Copa de España (FEFS) (3): 1983–84, 1985–86, 1987–88
- Campeonato de Clubs de España (3): 1979–80, 1980–81, 1981–82

=== European competitions ===
- UEFA Futsal Champions League (5): 2003–04, 2005–06, 2008–09, 2016–17, 2017–18
- European Champions Cup (1): 1990–91
- European Cup Winners' Cup (1): 2007–08
- Iberian Cup (2): 2004, 2006

=== International competitions ===
- Intercontinental Cup (5): 2005, 2006, 2007, 2008, 2011

=== Regional competitions ===
- Campeonato de Madrid: 8 (1993–94, 1994–95, 1998–99, 1999–00, 2000–01, 2005–06, 2007–08, 2009–10)
