= Tercera División de Futsal =

- Founded: 1990
- Country: Spain
- Confederation: UEFA
- Number of clubs: 331 teams in 24 groups
- Level on pyramid: 4
- Promotion to: Segunda División B
- Relegation to: Divisiones Regionales
- Domestic cup: None
- International cup: None
- Website: link on every group

The Tercera División de Fútbol Sala Masculina, formerly known as Primera Nacional B, is the fourth level according to the Spanish futsal league system. Founded in 1990, it is managed by the Real Federación Española de Fútbol.

The Tercera División de Fútbol Sala Masculina works similar to the Tercera Federación of Spanish football. It is the fourth tier like the former Tercera División, and it is divided into twenty-four groups, corresponding to the Autonomous communities of Spain, excepting Catalonia which has two groups (1 and 2), Community of Madrid (3 and 4), Canary Islands (11 –Province of Las Palmas– and 12 –Province of Santa Cruz de Tenerife–), Valencian Community (14 and 15 –Province of Alicante–), Andalusia (17 –Western Andalusia– and 18 –Eastern Andalusia–).

All the groups are made up by sixteen teams, except the groups 7 (Navarre –thirteen teams–), 11 (Canary Islands –eleven teams–), 12 (Canary Islands –fourteen teams–), 19 (Balearic Islands –fourteen teams–), 20 (La Rioja –fourteen teams–) and 21 (Cantabria –eight teams–). Group 22 (Ceuta) just has one team, Real Sociedad La Pantera; and Group 24 (Melilla) does not have any team for this current season.

Every group champion promotes directly to Segunda División B. The runner-ups qualify for the national promotion playoff, which will be a single knockout round, home and away tie.

== Groups and teams (2013–14 season) ==
=== Group 1 (Catalonia) ===
2025–26 Tercera División de Fútbol Sala Masculina teams (Group 1)
Teams located in Barcelona city: Espanyol, Montsant FS, Prosperitat
Teams located in Mataró: Futsal Mataró CE, Mataró-Enlleura’t

Club	City
AE Ciutat de Mataró-Enlleura’t	Mataró
Arenys Munt Club FS	Arenys de Munt
Castellar Fútbol Sala	Castellar Del Vallès
Cerdanyola del Vallès FC	Cerdanyola del Vallès
Club Deportiu Espanyol Sentiment Perico	Barcelona
Club Natació Caldes FS	Caldes de Montbui
Escola Pia Sabadell CE	Sabadell
Esportiu Rubí FS	Rubí
Futsal Mataró CE	Mataró
La Unión-Las Palmas FS	Santa Coloma de Gramenet
Montsant FS	Barcelona
Olimpyc Floresta FS	Sant Cugat del Vallès
Pineda FS AER	Pineda de Mar
Prosperitat Nou Barris CEFS	Barcelona
Ripollet FS	Ripollet
Sant Joan de Vilassar FS	Vilassar de Mar

=== Group 2 (Catalonia) ===
	Club	City	Link
1	Riera Nivell 28	Cornellà de Llobregat	
2	L'Hospitalet Bellsport B	L'Hospitalet de Llobregat	
3	Pallejà	Pallejà	
4	Sport Esplugues	Esplugues de Llobregat	
5	Olimpyc Floresta	La Floresta	
6	Can Titó Vilanova	Vilanova del Camí	
7	Sant Sadurní	Sant Sadurní d'Anoia	
8	Auto Nayox Tàrrega	Tàrrega	
9	Gavà	Gavà	
10	Sefocat Salou	Salou	
11	~~Laguna~~	Cambrils	
12	Altafulla	Altafulla	
13	Balaguer	Balaguer	
14	Sala 5 Martorell	Martorell	
15	Sant Vicenç	Sant Vicenç dels Horts	
16	Castellbisbal	Castellbisbal	

=== Group 3 (Madrid) ===
	Club	City	Link
1	Rayo Lorea II	Fuenlabrada	
2	Valdeiglesias	San Martín de Valdeiglesias	
3	Saga	Majadahonda	
4	N.H. Alcorcón 98	Alcorcón	
5	Rivas 95 Carnicer	Rivas Vaciamadrid	
6	J3 Ayllón	Madrid	
7	La Villa Arroyomolinos	Arroyomolinos	
8	Ciudad de Alcorcón	Alcorcón	
9	El Álamo	El Álamo	
10	Villaverde	Villaverde, Madrid	
11	Torrelodones	Torrelodones	
12	Fuenlabrada Amistad 94	Fuenlabrada	
13	Diagonal	Parla	

=== Group 4 (Madrid) ===
	Club	City	Link
1	Escurialense	San Lorenzo de El Escorial	
2	Tecnoy Gran Peña	Arganzuela, Madrid	
3	Equipo 38–Atl. Argüelles	Madrid	
4	Collado Mediano Ferretería La Única	Collado Mediano	
5	ADAE Simancas	Simancas, Madrid	
6	InterMovistar B	Alcalá de Henares	
7	Distrito III	Alcalá de Henares	
8	Los Mayas Celta	Madrid	
9	Casco Antiguo Carabanchel	Carabanchel, Madrid	
10	Insepal Valdetorres	Valdetorres de Jarama	
11	SEAT Torrejón–Parque Cataluña	Torrejón de Ardoz	
12	MV Chamartín	Madrid	
13	Colmenar Viejo	Colmenar Viejo	
14	Las Rozas Boadilla	Boadilla del Monte	

=== Group 5 (Principality of Asturias) ===
2025–26 Tercera División de Fútbol Sala Masculina teams (Group 5)

Club	City
5 As FS	Piedrasblancas, Castrillón
Alto Aller FS	Cabanaquinta/Cabañaquinta, Aller/Ayer
Amigos Soto Barco FS	Sotu, Soto del Barco/Sotu'l Barcu
Arenas de Manzaneda FS	Santaolaya, Oviedo/Uviéu
Atlético Moscón FS	Grau/Grado
Avilés Sport FS	Avilés
CD Gijón Playas FS	Gijón/Xixón
CD Txamón Oviedo FS	Oviedo/Uviéu
Club Concejo Valdés	Luarca/Ḷḷuarca, Valdés
El Franco FS	A Caridá, El Franco
Infiesto FS	L'Infiestu, Piloña
La Isla de Siero FS	La Pola Siero, Siero
Lugones Rangers	Lugones/Llugones, Siero
Racing de Mieres FS	Mieres del Camín, Mieres
San Cucao FS	Posada, Llanera
Santa Cruz FS	Santa Cruz, Mieres

=== Group 6 (Basque Country) ===
	Club	City	Link
1	Goierri	Urretxu	
2	Lauburu Ibarra	Ibarra	
3	Internacional Eder Kafetegia	San Sebastián	
4	Mallabia Seguros Altaldi	Zaldibar	
5	~~Sestao~~	Sestao	
6	Soloarte	Basauri	
7	Clínica Dental Aldaz	Lasarte-Oria	
8	Egintza Transportes Lakunza	Villabona	
9	Aurrerá Vitoria	Vitoria-Gasteiz	
10	Laskorain	Tolosa	
11	Cerámicas Nogales	Zarautz	
12	Hirukide Ikastetxea	Tolosa	
13	Naturgas Energía	Bilbao	
14	Tecuni Bilbo	Bilbao	
15	San Jorge Santurtzi	Santurtzi	
16	Santurtzi	Santurtzi	

=== Group 7 (Navarre) ===
	Club	City	Link
1	San Juan B	Pamplona	
2	Aran Sport Peralta	Peralta – Azkoien	
3	Kirol Sport B	Orkoien	
4	Gazte Berriak	Ansoáin	
5	Tafatrans Vulcanizados Ruiz	Tafalla	
6	Ciudadela	Pamplona	
7	Fluitecnik Xota	Irurtzun	
8	Gima Ribera Navarra	Tudela	
9	Universidad de Pamplona	Pamplona	

=== Group 8 (Galicia) ===
	Club	City	Link
1	O'Esteo	As Pontes	
2	Concello de Vigo IES Coruxo	Vigo	
3	Leis Pontevedra	Pontevedra	
4	Burela Pescados Rubén B	Burela	
5	Pizzbur Cidade de Viveiro	Viveiro	
6	Superti–Pontenova	A Pontenova	
7	Xove	Xove	
8	5 Coruña	A Coruña	
9	Valdesuso Peugeot Vilalba	Vilalba	
10	Carballiño	O Carballiño	
11	Ventorrillo	A Coruña	
12	Ribeira de Piquín	Ribeira de Piquín	
13	Bueu	Bueu	
14	Eypar Melide	Melide	
15	Pazos	Pazos de Borbén	
16	CAFyD	Marín	

=== Group 9 (Castile and León) ===
	Club	City	Link
1	Tama Zarzuela	Zarzuela del Pinar	
2	El Espinar Arlequín	El Espinar	
3	Sani 2000	Palencia	
4	Juventud del Círculo	Burgos	
5	Atlético Benavente	Benavente	
6	Unión Arroyo	Arroyo de la Encomienda	
7	Emina Medina	Medina del Campo	
8	Cabezón	Cabezón de Pisuerga	
9	Cistierna	Cistierna	
10	~~Vegazana~~	León	
11	La Bañeza	La Bañeza	
12	Alhambra de Guijuelo	Guijuelo	
13	Viajes Ecuador	Ciudad Rodrigo	
14	Confitería Gil	Salamanca	

=== Group 10 (Aragon) ===
	Club	City	Link
1	Mas de las Matas	Mas de las Matas	
2	Sala Cadrete 2010	Cadrete	
3	Unizar Ebrosala	Zaragoza	
4	Mosqueruela	Mosqueruela	
5	Tauste	Tauste	
6	Umacon Zaragoza B	Zaragoza	
7	Exea	Ejea de los Caballeros	
8	La Muela	La Muela	
9	Mapfre Aracep	Híjar	
10	Corona Delicias	Zaragoza	
11	Polideportivo Andorra	Andorra	
12	Maestrazgo	Cantavieja	
13	Alcañiz	Alcañiz	
14	Las Fuentes–Frecuencia 100	Zaragoza	
15	Peña 10 D'Agosto	Huesca	
16	Industrias Bial Caspe	Caspe	

=== Group 11 (Las Palmas) ===
- Removed for 2012–13 season.

=== Group 12 (Tenerife) ===
	Club	City	Link
1	Cruz de la Cebolla	La Orotava	
2	El Salto	Granadilla de Abona	
3	Cosmos II	Icod de los Vinos	
4	Famegonza B	San Cristóbal de La Laguna	
5	Las Vegas	Granadilla de Abona	
6	4Plusint Granadilla	Granadilla de Abona	
7	Santa Úrsula Pastir	Santa Úrsula	
8	Salesianos–La Orotava	La Orotava	
9	Orotava	La Orotava	
10	Atlántida	Breña Alta	

=== Group 13 (Murcia) ===
	Club	City	Link
1	Alcantarilla	Alcantarilla	
2	Futsal Librilla	Librilla	
3	Nuestro Abarán–Bar El Picoteo	Abarán	
4	CADE Capuchinos	Totana	
5	Pinatar Zambú	San Pedro del Pinatar	
6	Albatros Yecla	Yecla	
7	El Puntal	El Puntal, Murcia	
8	Bahía de Mazarrón	Mazarrón	
9	El Palmar	El Palmar, Murcia	
10	Plásticos Romero	Molina de Segura	
11	Cora Vedruna	La Unión	

=== Group 14 (Castellón & Valencia) ===
	Club	City	Link
1	El Pilar	Valencia	
2	Mislata	Mislata	
3	L'Olleria	L'Olleria	
4	Alboraya	Alboraya	
5	Sucro Cullera	Cullera	
6	Restaurante Ribarrupea–Riba-Roja	Riba-roja de Túria	
7	Vilafamés–Playas de Castellón B	Vilafamés	
8	Micela Alzira	Alzira	
9	Segurgas Requena	Requena	
10	Tecopal Segorbe	Segorbe	
11	Eclipse Lounge Club	Gandia	
12	Valencia ElPozo	Valencia	
13	Auto Real/Molde Azul	Villarreal	
14	Bar Cajoanet Onda	Onda	
15	Castell de Peñiscola–Vinaròs	Vinaròs	
16	Cofrentes	Cofrentes	

=== Group 15 (Alicante) ===
	Club	City	Link
1	Unión Alcoyana	Alcoy	
2	L'Alfàs del Pi	L'Alfàs del Pi	
3	Xaloc–Peña Costa Rojiblanca	Alicante	
4	Elche	Elche	
5	Ibense	Ibi	
6	Mutxamel–Al Andalus	Mutxamel	
7	Ye Faky	Cocentaina	
8	Torrevieja	Torrevieja	
9	Racing Club Dinamita	Albatera	
10	Dénia–Restaurante Mena	Dénia	
11	Nueva Elda	Elda	
12	Elche Wonders	Elche	
13	Callosa	Callosa de Segura	

=== Group 16 (Castile-La Mancha) ===
	Club	City	Link
1	Azuqueca	Azuqueca de Henares	
2	Euroarmavi Villacañas	Villacañas	
3	Renacer Argamasilla	Argamasilla de Alba	
4	Pozuelo	Pozuelo de Calatrava	
5	Águila	Las Ventas con Peña Aguilera	
6	La Solana	La Solana	
7	Olías	Olías del Rey	
8	Lillo	Lillo	
9	Salesianos–Asesoría Yébenes	Ciudad Real	
10	Mora	Mora	
11	Atlético Almonacid	Almonacid de Zorita	
12	Menasalbas	Menasalbas	

=== Group 17 (Western Andalusia) ===
	Club	City	Link
1	Virgili	Cádiz	
2	mundoseguros.net–Triana	Triana, Seville	
3	Santaella 2000	Santaella	
4	Sinapsis	Luque	
5	Alcalá–Cervecería Santa Lucía	Alcalá de Guadaira	
6	Alchoyano	Alcalá de los Gazules	
7	Aquasierra	Villafranca de Córdoba	
8	Restaurante Rodri–Lepe	Lepe	
9	Floyd-M Villalba	Villalba del Alcor	
10	Tres Calles	La Rinconada	
11	Peña La Lata	Lucena	
12	Pub Trastevere–Pozoblanco	Pozoblanco	

=== Group 18 (Eastern Andalusia) ===
	Club	City	Link
1	5cina UPI–Mancha Real	Mancha Real	
2	El Ejido B	El Ejido	
3	Peligros	Peligros	
4	Torremolinos	Torremolinos	
5	Santa Isabel	Jaén	
6	Clínica Técnológica Médica	Pechina	
7	Algarinejo	Algarinejo	
8	Bayyana	Almería	
9	Rincón de la Victoria	Rincón de la Victoria	
10	Sala 12	Las Gabias	
11	Gádor	Gádor	
12	Victoria Kent	Alhaurín de la Torre	

=== Group 19 (Balearic Islands) ===
	Club	City	Link
1	Son Rapinya	Palma	
2	Atlético Isleño–Bar Norte	Ibiza Town	
3	Alcúdia	Alcúdia	
4	Son Oliva	Palma	
5	Entreculturas Montesión	Palma	
6	Racing Andratx	Andratx	
7	Eléctrica Ciem–Incacolor	Inca	
8	Space Gasifred Ciutat d'Eivissa	Ibiza Town	
9	Racing Formentera	Sant Francesc Xavier	
10	Ca's Capità	Cas Capità	
11	JMR Alaró	Alaró	
12	Just Just Sant Joan	Sant Joan	
13	Bahia's	Badia Gran	

=== Group 20 (La Rioja) ===
	Club	City	Link
1	Muebles Oyaga	Logroño	
2	Graccurris–Okodia	Alfaro	
3	Lardero–Ferrer Sport Center	Lardero	
4	Agoncillo	Agoncillo	
5	Ciudad de Viana–Hotel Pujadas	Viana, Navarre	
6	Albelda	Albelda de Iregua	
7	Nalda	Nalda	
8	Fuenmayor	Fuenmayor	
9	Sparta Harense	Haro	
10	Fin de Trimestre	Nájera	
11	Cerverano	Cervera del Río Alhama	
12	Garnacha	Logroño	
13	Adcaneos	Calahorra	
14	Rioja Sala	Logroño	

=== Group 21 (Cantabria) ===
	Club	City	Link
1	Muriedas–Urrutia	Muriedas	
2	Castro Urdiales	Castro Urdiales	
3	La Cavada–Posada Término	La Cavada	
4	La Contrina	Los Corrales de Buelna	
5	Canalsa Pecusa	Santander	
6	Peñucas	Santander	
7	Cons. José L. Cobo	Guarnizo	
8	Sámano–Dinamik	Sámano	
9	Samser	Meruelo	
10	Hoznayo Citroën	Hoznayo	
11	Interclym–Cicero	Cicero	
12	Adal–Treto/Autobuses Madrazo	Adal–Treto	

=== Group 22 (Castile-La Mancha) ===
- Removed for 2012–13 season.

=== Group 23 (Extremadura) ===
	Club	City	Link
1	Las Arenas Chapa y Pintura	Malpartida de Cáceres	
2	Fifty Fifty Outlet	Don Benito	
3	Zorita	Zorita	
4	Buhersa–Talayuela	Talayuela	
5	Madroñera	Madroñera	
6	Mérida Futsal	Mérida	
7	Olivenza–Asoc. Camino a la Vida	Olivenza	
8	Zarza–apartamentoslaantigua.com	Zarza de Granadilla	
9	Extremadura	Cáceres	
10	Jaraíz–Hotel Rural Villa Xarahíz	Jaraíz de la Vera	
11	El Cruce–Torrecillas	Torrecillas de la Tiesa	
12	Uniatec La Garrovilla	La Garrovilla	
13	Villa de Torremejía	Torremejía	
14	Fontanería Fenisa–Deleitosa	Deleitosa	
