= Primera División de Futsal =

Primera División
- Organising body: LNFS
- Founded: 1989; 37 years ago
- Country: Spain
- Confederation: UEFA
- Number of clubs: 16
- Level on pyramid: Level 1
- Relegation to: Segunda División
- Domestic cup(s): Supercopa de España; Copa de España; Copa del Rey
- International cup: UEFA Futsal Champions; League
- Current champions: FC Barcelona (8th title) (2025–26)
- Most championships: Inter Movistar (14 titles)
- Broadcasters: GOL PLAY, LaLiga+, FORTA, Barça TV, Esport3
- Sponsor: Joma
- Website: LNFS.es
- Current: 2025–26 season

The Primera División is the premier professional futsal league in Spain. It was founded in 1989 with the name of División de Honor. Administered by Liga Nacional de Fútbol Sala, it is contested by 16 teams and is played under UEFA rules.

The Liga Nacional de Futsal includes:

- Primera División de Futsal — 1st level.
- Segunda División — 2nd level.

== Liga championship rules ==
Each team of every division has to play with all the other teams of its division twice, once at home and the other at the opponent's stadium. This means that in Liga Nacional de Futbol Sala the league ends after every team plays 30 matches.

Like many other leagues in continental Europe, the Liga Nacional de Futbol Sala takes a winter break once each team has played half its schedule. One unusual feature of the league is that the two halves of the season are played in the same order—that is, the order of each team's first-half fixtures is repeated in the second half of the season, with the only difference being the stadiums used.

Each victory adds 3 points to the team in the league ranking. Each drawn adds 1 point. At the end of the league, the winner is:

1. The team that has most points in the ranking.
2. If two or more teams are level on points, the winner is the team that has the best results head-to-head.
3. If there is no winner after applying the second rule, then the team with the best overall goal difference wins.

== History ==
- Before the creation of the Liga Nacional de Fútbol Sala in 1989, in Spain were played two futsal championship at the same time, one managed by the Spanish Futsal Federation (FEFS), and the other by the Royal Spanish Football Federation (RFEF). Previously to any futsal league, futsal was limited to benefic and exhibition matches. In 1989, after of years of struggle for the futsal control, the two futsal club associations, ACEFS and ASOFUSA merge to create Liga Nacional de Fútbol Sala.
- From 2011–12' season onwards, División de Honor will be known as Primera División.
- On the 2012–13 season, the league was reduced from 16 to 14 teams.
- On the 2014-15 season the league returned to have 16 teams.

== Clubs ==
The following 16 clubs are competing in the 2024–25 season.

Club	Location	Stadium	Capacity
(Aragon) AD Sala 10	Zaragoza	CDM Siglo XXI	2,900
(Catalonia) FC Barcelona Futsal	Barcelona	Palau Blaugrana	7,585
(Galicia (Spain)) CD Burela FS	Burela	Pabellón Municipal Vista Alegre	1,400
(Andalusia) Córdoba Futsal	Córdoba	Palacio Municipal de Deportes Vista Alegre	3,500
(Region of Murcia) ElPozo Murcia FS	Murcia	Palacio de Deportes de Murcia	7,500
(Catalonia) Industrias Santa Coloma	Santa Coloma	Pabellón Nuevo	1,500
(Community of Madrid) Inter Movistar	Torrejón de Ardoz	Pabellón Jorge Garbajosa	3,200
(Andalusia) Jaén Paraíso Interior	Jaén	Olivo Arena	6,589
(Region of Murcia) Jimbee Cartagena	Cartagena	Palacio de los Deportes de Cartagena	4,060
(Castilla–La Mancha) Manzanares FS	Manzanares	Pabellón Municipal Antonio Caba	610
(Galicia (Spain)) Noia FS	Noia	Pabellón Municipal Agustín Mourís	600
(Balearic Islands) Palma Futsal	Palma de Mallorca	Palau Municipal d'Esports Son Moix	3,800
(Valencian Community) Peñíscola FS	Peñíscola	Pabellón Juan Vizcarro	1,000
(Navarre) Ribera Navarra FS	Tudela	Pabellón Ciudad de Tudela	1,200
(Castilla–La Mancha) Viña Albali Valdepeñas	Valdepeñas	Pabellón Virgen de la Cabeza	2,000
(Navarre) Xota FS	Pamplona	Pabellón Anaitasuna	3,000

=== Team changes ===
Promoted from 2023–24 Segunda División	Relegated to 2024–25 Segunda División
(Aragon) AD Sala 10 (Galicia (Spain)) CD Burela FS	(Valencian Community) Alzira FS (Andalusia) Real Betis Futsal

== All-time standings ==
=== Champions ===
Season	Champion	Score	Runner-up	Losing semi-finalists
1989–90	(Community of Madrid) Interviú Lloyd's	5–4, 4–3	(Valencian Community) Keralite Macer	(Castile and León) Caja Segovia and (Community of Madrid) Marsanz Torrejón
1990–91	(Community of Madrid) Interviú Lloyd's	7–8, 7–6, 6–4	(Community of Madrid) Marsanz Torrejón	(Community of Madrid) Algón and (Valencian Community) Macer Almazora
1991–92	(Castilla–La Mancha) Caja Toledo	5–2, 5–3	(Region of Murcia) ElPozo Murcia	(Community of Madrid) Interviú Boomerang and (Aragon) Sego Zaragoza
1992–93	(Community of Madrid) Pennzoil Marsanz	1–1, 4–4, 5–3	(Castilla–La Mancha) Caja Castilla-La Mancha	(Community of Madrid) Interviú Boomerang and (Aragon) Sego Zaragoza
1993–94	(Canary Islands) Maspalomas Sol Europa	4–4, 1–1, 5–2	(Castilla–La Mancha) Caja Castilla-La Mancha	(Catalonia) FC Barcelona and (Aragon) Pinturas Lepanto
1994–95	(Aragon) Pinturas Lepanto	1–3, 4–3, 6–4	(Community of Madrid) Interviú Boomerang	(Community of Madrid) Mejorada and (Valencian Community) Playas de Castellón
1995–96	(Community of Madrid) Interviú Boomerang	1–1, 3–3, 3–2	(Castilla–La Mancha) Toledart	(Region of Murcia) P.B. Alcantarilla and (Valencian Community) Playas de Castellón
1996–97	(Castilla–La Mancha) CLM Talavera	2–1, 7–5, 3–1	(Valencian Community) Playas de Castellón	(Region of Murcia) ElPozo Murcia and (Canary Islands) Maspalomas Sol Europa
1997–98	(Region of Murcia) ElPozo Murcia	5–0, 4–2, 2–5, 4–5, 4–2	(Castilla–La Mancha) CLM Talavera	(Community of Madrid) Boomerang Interviú and (Castile and León) Caja Segovia
1998–99	(Castile and León) Caja Segovia	6–5, 5–4, 5–2	(Catalonia) Industrias García	(Castilla–La Mancha) CLM Talavera and (Valencian Community) Playas de Castellón
1999–2000	(Valencian Community) Playas de Castellón	4–1, 5–3, 3–2	(Castilla–La Mancha) CLM Talavera	(Community of Madrid) Airtel Boomerang and (Castile and León) Caja Segovia
2000–01	(Valencian Community) Playas de Castellón	6–2, 3–1, 3–7, 3–0	(Valencian Community) Valencia Vijusa	(Community of Madrid) Antena3 Boomerang and (Region of Murcia) ElPozo Murcia
2001–02	(Community of Madrid) Antena3 Boomerang	5–4, 5–4, 3–7, 5–3	(Catalonia) Miró Martorell	(Castile and León) Caja Segovia and (Region of Murcia) ElPozo Murcia
2002–03	(Community of Madrid) Boomerang Interviú	3–4, 4–2, 6–2, 2–3, 3–2	(Region of Murcia) ElPozo Murcia	(Catalonia) Miró Martorell and (Valencian Community) Playas de Castellón
2003–04	(Community of Madrid) Boomerang Interviú	4–7, 5–4, 9–1, 3–4, 7–4	(Region of Murcia) ElPozo Murcia	(Valencian Community) Playas de Castellón and (Region of Murcia) P.W. Cartagena
2004–05	(Community of Madrid) Boomerang Interviú	6–5, 3–4, 7–5, 6–3	(Region of Murcia) ElPozo Murcia	(Navarre) MRA Gvtarra and (Region of Murcia) P.W. Cartagena
2005–06	(Region of Murcia) ElPozo Murcia	3–7, 5–2, 3–2, 2–3, 4–2	(Region of Murcia) Polaris World Cartagena	(Community of Madrid) Boomerang Interviú and (Catalonia) FS Martorell
2006–07	(Region of Murcia) ElPozo Murcia	8–7, 3–2	(Community of Madrid) Boomerang Interviú	(Valencian Community) Benicarló Onda Urbana and (Region of Murcia) P.W. Cartagena
2007–08	(Community of Madrid) Interviú Fadesa	3–1, 8–5	(Region of Murcia) ElPozo Murcia	(Catalonia) Barcelona Senseit and (Community of Madrid) Carnicer Torrejón
2008–09	(Region of Murcia) ElPozo Murcia	3–2, 7–2	(Community of Madrid) Inter Movistar	(Galicia (Spain)) Lobelle de Santiago and (Community of Madrid) Pinto FS
2009–10	(Region of Murcia) ElPozo Murcia	3–2, 2–1, 1–3, 6–1	(Navarre) MRA Navarra	(Castile and León) Caja Segovia and (Catalonia) FC Barcelona
2010–11	(Catalonia) FC Barcelona	2–3, 4–2, 4–1, 2–4, 3–2	(Castile and León) Caja Segovia	(Valencian Community) Benicarló A.C. and (Galicia (Spain)) Lobelle de Santiago
2011–12	(Catalonia) FC Barcelona	5–3, 1–6, 4–1, 4–5, 6–3	(Region of Murcia) ElPozo Murcia	(Castile and León) Caja Segovia and (Community of Madrid) Inter Movistar
2012–13	(Catalonia) FC Barcelona	1–0, 2–3, 6–3, 3–3 (5–3)	(Region of Murcia) ElPozo Murcia	(Castile and León) Caja Segovia and (Community of Madrid) Inter Movistar
2013–14	(Community of Madrid) Inter Movistar	4–3, 4–1, 4–2	(Region of Murcia) ElPozo Murcia	(Catalonia) FC Barcelona and (Catalonia) Marfil Santa Coloma
2014–15	(Community of Madrid) Inter Movistar	7–3, 1–5, 3–0, 5–4	(Region of Murcia) ElPozo Murcia	(Catalonia) FC Barcelona and (Balearic Islands) Palma Futsal
2015–16	(Community of Madrid) Inter Movistar	6–2, 5–3, 4–6, 3–1	(Catalonia) FC Barcelona	(Navarre) Magna Gurpea and (Balearic Islands) Palma Futsal
2016–17	(Community of Madrid) Inter Movistar	2–2 (1–3), 6–1, 1–6, 6–1, 2–1	(Catalonia) FC Barcelona	(Region of Murcia) ElPozo Murcia and (Navarre) Magna Gurpea
2017–18	(Community of Madrid) Inter Movistar	4–2, 4–2, 2–3, 3–3 (1–3), 1–1 (3–1)	(Catalonia) FC Barcelona	(Region of Murcia) ElPozo Murcia and (Andalusia) Jaén Fútbol Sala
2018–19	(Catalonia) FC Barcelona	7–2, 2–3, 3–3 (3–4), 7–3, 3–2	(Region of Murcia) ElPozo Murcia	(Andalusia) Jaén Paraíso Interior and (Balearic Islands) Palma Futsal
2019–20	(Community of Madrid) Inter Movistar	3–3 (Note: Due to the COVID-19 pandemic in Spain, the 2019-20 Season Playoffs changed to a best-of-one match format. If the match ended on a tie there was no extra-time nor penalty shootouts, instead, the best ranked team on the regular season were declared as winners.)	(Castilla–La Mancha) Viña Albali Valdepeñas	(Valencian Community) Levante UD and (Balearic Islands) Palma Futsal
2020–21	(Catalonia) FC Barcelona	2–2 (4–5), 4–3, 2–2 (5–4)	(Valencian Community) Levante UD	(Balearic Islands) Palma Futsal and (Castilla–La Mancha) Viña Albali Valdepeñas
2021–22	(Catalonia) FC Barcelona	4–2, 4–2	(Balearic Islands) Palma Futsal	(Andalusia) Jaén F.S. and (Castilla–La Mancha) Viña Albali Valdepeñas
2022–23	(Catalonia) FC Barcelona	3–2, 5–2, 5–2	(Andalusia) Jaén Paraíso Interior	(Community of Madrid) Inter Movistar and (Balearic Islands) Palma Futsal
2023–24	(Region of Murcia) Jimbee Cartagena	2–1, 2–1, 3–3 (2–4), 5–2	(Region of Murcia) ElPozo Murcia	(Catalonia) FC Barcelona and (Andalusia) Jaén
2024–25	(Region of Murcia) Jimbee Cartagena	3–5, 3–2, 3–2, 3–2	(Catalonia) FC Barcelona	(Region of Murcia) ElPozo Murcia and (Balearic Islands) Palma Futsal
2025–26	(Catalonia) FC Barcelona	5–5 (3-2), 6–1, 4–5, 6–4	(Region of Murcia) ElPozo Murcia	(Balearic Islands) Palma Futsal and (Community of Madrid) Inter Movistar

=== Performance by club ===
Club	Titles	Seasons
Inter Movistar	14	1989–90, 1990–91, 1995–96, 2001–02, 2002–03, 2003–04, 2004–05, 2007–08, 2013–14, 2014–15, 2015–16, 2016–17, 2017–18, 2019–20
FC Barcelona	8	2010–11, 2011–12, 2012–13, 2018–19, 2020–21, 2021–22, 2022–23, 2025–26
ElPozo Murcia	5	1997–98, 2005–06, 2006–07, 2008–09, 2009–10
Jimbee Cartagena	2	2023–24, 2024–25
Playas de Castellón	2	1999–2000, 2000–01
Caja Toledo/CLM Talavera	2	1991–92, 1996–97
Caja Segovia	1	1998–99
Pinturas Lepanto	1	1994–95
Maspalomas Sol Europa	1	1993–94
Marsanz Torrejón	1	1992–93

=== All-time LNFS table ===
Pos	Team	Seasons	Played	Won	Drawn	Lost	G.F.	G.A.	G.D.	Points
1	ElPozo Murcia	26	772	523	103	146	3870	2421	1449	1587
2	Inter Movistar	26	784	525	122	135	3556	2129	1427	1583
3	Playas de Castellón	22	658	375	112	181	2913	2153	760	1145
4	Caja Segovia	24	724	356	121	247	3000	2570	430	1110
5	FC Barcelona	21	624	310	95	219	2377	1961	416	947
6	Marfil Santa Coloma	23	652	257	95	330	2665	2898	−233	802
7	Magna Gurpea	17	514	206	92	216	1892	1909	−17	710
8	Carnicer Torrejón	15	462	172	81	209	1790	1895	−105	597
9	Cartagena	14	430	158	91	181	1538	1634	−96	565
10	CLM Talavera	10	306	200	39	67	1452	941	511	552

League or status at 2015–16 season:

Primera División
Segunda División
Segunda División B
Tercera División
Regional divisions
No longer affiliated with RFEF
Club disbanded

- Updated at completion of 2014–15 season.
