= Lozano (surname) =

Lozano is a surname of Spanish and also Italian-Swiss origins. Notable people with the surname include:

== Surname ==
- Agricol Lozano (1927–1999), Mexican poet, historian, and leader
- Alejandro Lozano (artist) (1939–2003), Spanish artist, painter and mosaic muralist
- Alejandro Lozano (footballer) (born 2005), Spanish football winger
- Álvaro Lozano (born 1964), Colombian road racing cyclist
- Anthony Lozano (born 1993), Honduran football player
- Armando Lozano (born 1984), Spanish football player
- Bani Lozano (born 1987), Honduran football player
- Carolina Telechea i Lozano (born 1981), Catalan politician
- César Lozano (born 1977), Mexican football player
- Chris Lozano (born 1982), American mixed martial arts fighter
- Conrad Lozano (born 1951), American musician for Los Lobos
- Demetrio Lozano (born 1975), Spanish handball player
- Enriqueta Lozano (1829/30-1895), Spanish writer
- Florencia Lozano (born 1969), American actress
- Francisco Lozano (1932–2008), Mexican Olympic cyclist, also known as "el camaron Lozano"
- Guillermina Lozano, American geneticist
- Gustavo Lozano-Contreras (1938–2000), Colombian botanist
- Hirving Lozano (born 1995), Mexican football player
- Ignacio E. Lozano Jr. (born 1927), former United States Ambassador to El Salvador
- Ignacio E. Lozano Sr. (1886–1953), Mexican-born American journalist
- Irene Lozano (born 1971), Spanish journalist, writer, and politician
- Jaime Lozano (born 1979), Mexican football player
- Javier Lozano (disambiguation)
- John Harold Lozano (born 1972), Colombian retired football player
- John Jairo Lozano (born 1984), Colombian football player
- Jorge Lozano (born 1963), Mexican retired professional tennis player
- Jorge Tadeo Lozano (1771–1816), Neogranadine (now Colombian) scientist, journalist, and politician
- José I. Lozano (born 1954), American vice-chairman and executive vice-president of Impremedia LLC
- José Manuel Lozano (born 1980), member of the Texas House of Representatives
- José María Lozano (1878–1933), Secretary of Public Education and Fine Arts for Victoriano Huerta, during the Mexican Revolution
- Juan Lozano (born 1955), Spanish football player
- Karyme Lozano (born 1978), Mexican-born telenovela actress and singer
- Ladislas Lozano (born 1952), Spanish football coach and player
- Lee Lozano (1930-1999), American painter and visual and conceptual artist
- Liliana Lozano (1978–2009), Colombian actress and beauty queen
- Lourdes Lozano (born 1962), Mexican fencer
- Luis Lozano (born 1992), Mexican sprint canoer
- Mario Lozano, member of the U.S. Army indicted by an Italian court for his role in the death of Italian Secret Service officer Nicola Calipari
- Manuel Lozano (disambiguation)
- Margarita Lozano (1931–2022), Spanish actress
- Miguel Ángel Lozano (born 1990), Mexican-American comedian
- Miguel Ángel Lozano (born 1978), Spanish football player
- Mimi Lozano (born 1933), American educator and activist for Hispanic rights
- Monica C. Lozano (born 1956), American newspaper editor
- Oliver Lozano (1940–2018), legal counsel of the late Ferdinand Marcos
- Olivia Lozano (born 1959), Venezuelan politician
- Oriol Lozano (born 1981), Spanish football player
- Pedro Lozano (1697–1752), Spanish ethnographer, historian and Jesuit missionary
- Rafael Lozano (born 1970), Spanish former boxer
- Raúl Lozano (volleyball) (born 1956), Argentine volleyball coach
- Rudy Lozano (1951–1983), Chicago politician and activist
- Rodolfo Lozano (1942–2018), American jurist
- Ryan Lozano (died 2013), Belizean shooting victim
- Tilsa Lozano (born 1982), Peruvian model
- Verónica Lozano (born 1970), Argentine actress and TV host
- Virgil Lozano (born 1979), Mexican mixed martial artist

== People with compound surnames ==
- Javier Lozano Alarcón (born 1962), Mexican politician
- Javier Lozano Chavira (born 1971), Mexican football player
- Javier Lozano Cid (born 1960), Spanish futsal player
- Gustavo Lozano-Contreras (1938-2000), Colombian botanist
- Angélica Lozano Correa (born 1975), Colombian lawyer and politician
- Julio Lozano Díaz (1885–1957), President of Honduras from 1954 to 1956
- Carmen Lozano Dumler (1921–2015), one of the first Puerto Rican women to become a United States Army officer
- Rafael Lozano-Hemmer (born 1967), Mexican-Canadian electronic artist
- Sergio Lozano Martínez (born 1988), Spanish futsal player
- Juan Manuel Lozano Mejía (1929–2007), Mexican physicist
- Allisson Marian Lozano Núñez (born 1992), Mexican actress model and singer
- Juan Lozano Ramírez (born 1964), Colombian lawyer and journalist
- Rafael Aceves y Lozano (1837–1876), Spanish composer
- Guzmán Casaseca Lozano (born 1984), Spanish professional football player
- Fernando de Buen y Lozano (1895-1962), Spanish ichthyologist and oceanographer
- Francisco de Paula del Villar y Lozano (1828–1901), Spanish architect
- Raúl García Lozano (born 1980), Spanish football player
- José Jiménez Lozano (1930–2020), Spanish writer
- José Mariano Mociño Suárez Lozano (1757–1820), naturalist from New Spain
- Jesús Olmo Lozano (born 1985), Spanish football player
- José Guadalupe Padilla Lozano (1920–2013), Mexican prelate of the Roman Catholic Church
- Julio Palacios Lozano (born 1962), Salvadoran football player
- Julio Palau Lozano (1925–2015), Valencian pilota Escala i corda variant player
- Rafael Ramos Lozano (born 1982), Spanish football player
- Octavio Paz Lozano (1914–1998), Mexican writer, poet, and diplomat
- Rodrigo Ríos Lozano (born 1990), Spanish football player
- Ángel Rodríguez Lozano (born 1952), Spanish radio journalist
- Francisco Ruiz Lozano (1607-1677), Peruvian soldier, astronomer, mathematician, and educator
- Raúl Salinas Lozano (1917–2004), Mexican economist
