= La Prensa (San Antonio) =

Former Spanish-language newspaper in San Antonio, Texas

La Prensa (bygone publication)
- Type: Daily newspaper
- Founder: Ignacio E. Lozano, Sr.
- Publisher: Lozano Newspapers, Inc.
- Founded: February 13, 1913
- Ceased publication: January 31, 1963
- Headquarters: San Antonio, Texas
- OCLC number: 9505681

La Prensa ("The Press") was an American Spanish-language daily newspaper based in San Antonio, Texas, that ran from February 13, 1913, to May 29, 1959, under the Lozano family, then until January 31, 1963, under successive owners.

== History of La Prensa ==
La Prensa was founded on February 13, 1913, in San Antonio as a weekly newspaper by Ignacio Eugenio Lozano, Sr. (1886–1953), a prominent exile of Mexico, native of Nuevo Leon, and supporter of Porfirio Diaz leading up to, and throughout the Mexican Revolution. Nine days later, Mexico's President Francisco I. Madero was assassinated. The era was coincident with a large influx of Mexican exiles in America who had fled after a series of revolutionary-related civil unrest. La Prensa, according to historian Richard Griswold del Castillo, PhD, had two missions: (i) to serve as the voice of the Mexican exile community and (ii) to defend and represent the views of the wealthy Mexican exiles who favored Diaz. La Prensa's editorials strongly challenged Mexican public policy. The upshot was that its editorial positions mirrored the political ideologies of Lozano.

From 1913 to 1954, La Prensa was the leading Spanish-language newspaper circulating in South Texas. For many years, it was the most widely circulated Spanish-language newspaper in the United States and had an international readership. During its first two decades, it covered topics pertinent to exiles of the Mexican Revolution, from 1910 to 1930. The lifespan of La Prensa covered eras of World War I, the decline of organized labor in the U.S. during the 1920s, the rise in the U.S. stock market between 1924 and 1929, the Great Crash, the Wall Street Crash of 1929, and the Great Depression that followed, the New Deal, World War II, and the emergence of the U.S. as a superpower. Yet through all that, in contrast to mainstream newspapers in the U.S., La Prensa devoted considerable coverage to matters relating to Mexico, and was the leading publication in opposition to the Mexican Revolution. For mainstream U.S. newspapers, matters in Europe were more important than matters in Mexico, which positioned La Prensa in an elevated role as a prime-source for important news involving Mexico.

La Prensa was also a leading voice for Mexican culture, which at the time, was a renaissance of literature, film, visual arts (including muralism), and music (including Carlos Chávez). For Mexico, it was a vibrant period, and yet one of economic challenges and public policy shifts.

La Prensa's domestic and international readership peaked during the Mexican Revolution, due largely to its position as the leading U.S. publication covering Mexico; and, unlike the print media of Mexico, La Prensa was free to print news and editorials of its choosing. In the 1920s, Los Angeles surpassed San Antonio as the U.S. city with the largest concentration of Mexicans. In the same decade, La Prensa's largest readership shifted to Los Angeles. On September 16, 1926, (Mexican Independence Day), Lozano launched the Los Angeles-based Spanish-language daily newspaper, La Opinión. As of the current date – 2=mdy — La Opinión is in its ninety-ninth year. It is the nation's oldest Mexican-American daily newspaper, the largest U.S. Spanish-language daily newspaper, and is still directed by the Lozano family. La Opinión is the enduring legacy of La Prensa.

After the Mexican Revolution, another Mexican cultural renaissance flourished, giving more rich material for La Prensa and the two U.S. cities with the largest Mexican and Mexican-American populations. New York, at the time, had a large Spanish-speaking population, but it was not predominately Mexican.

In 1936, following the Mexican Revolution, the Spanish Civil War broke-out. La Prensa was an important publication for politically engaged people of Mexico and exiled Mexicans in the U.S. involved in helping integrate Spanish exiles who were fleeing falangism. In 1953, the year that Lozano died, the Cuban Revolution began.

Yet, circulation of La Prensa declined in the late 1950s due to several factors, namely a waning public yearning to restore pre-Mexican Revolution values, a drop in Spanish literacy by writers and readers of newer generations of U.S.-born American citizens of Mexican ancestry, and a desire by newer generations to assimilate and embrace the pop culture of the post-swing and pre-rock-n-roll eras.

Given that La Prensa, under its founders, was strongly linked to its view of conservative pre-Revolution Mexican values, some scholars attribute its decline to being stuck in a bygone era while major cultural changes were occurring in new-generation Mexican-Americans – changes that included the Americanization of La Prensa's readership. The Lozono family – who sold La Prensa at a low in 1959 but retained their Los Angeles newspaper, La Opinión — struggled with changes during the decade that followed the death of their patriarch, but they had several advantages over the successive owners of La Prensa. The new generation of Lozanos, led by the American-born Ignacio E. Lozano, Jr., identified with forward-thinking Americans of Mexican ancestry. Moreover, Ignacio, Jr. had experience of having worked in the family business with the mentoring of a lifetime from his father, mother and executives close to the family.

"Mexico abroad" was a fashionable term among many Mexican exiles. La Prensa was distinctly different from other major U.S. Spanish-language newspapers because of its allegiance to Mexico and its people.

La Prensa and La Opinión have become, spontaneously and automatically, the strongest links among all these Mexicans and their work in favor of "Mexico abroad" has surpassed the effectiveness of the work of all our border area consulates ... These newspapers have shown Mexicans in Mexico the intensity of the life of Mexicans abroad. Without them, Mexicans inside Mexico would not know that thousands of fellow countrymen live abroad who have not lost their Mexican spirit or broken their spiritual ties with our homeland.

— Juan Sánchez Azcona (es), 1929

In the latter part of the 19th century, the phrase "Mexican-American", as an ethnic classification or reference, was still commonly used, but it waned in favor of other expressions. Some historians and scholars have opined that the waning might have been a result of:

1. a loss of Mexican cultural values or allegiance to Mexico by newer generations born in America
2. fatigue from stereotyping
3. a broader mix of Spanish-speaking Americans from other countries blurring lines of ethnic identity
4. a desire for a broader ethnic or full-American or worldly or hipper identity by Mexican-Americans
5. dilution degrees of Mexican-American ethnicity of successive generations
6. a disavowal of the patriarchal, conservative values attached to the phrase by the early 19th-century generation of Mexican exiles
7. any combination(s) thereof

The headquarters for La Prensa always remained in San Antonio. In the era when the Lozano family controlled both La Prensa and La Opinión, until 1956, the headquarters for both remained in San Antonio.

== Editorial bent ==
Conservative political stance towards the Mexican Revolution

The right-wing views harbored by Mexican Revolution era exiles in the U.S. had some similarities to the right-wing views of Cuban exiles from the Cuban Revolution. That is, the so-called labor classes wanted change while wealthier classes, particularity those who fled, feared that change would result in economic ruin – and resisting change would threaten their lives. From 1913, throughout the Mexican Revolution, the editorials of La Prensa included contributions by prominent Mexican intellectual exiles that supported Porfirista policies – policies that included strongman political stability, anti-socialist pro-foreign economic intervention, and a united nationalistic society. Its negative views of the revolution complicated the Texas Mexican's attitudes towards both Mexico and the U.S.

In contrast to La Prensa's stance against labor uprisings in Mexico during the Revolution, La Prensa was an influential watchdog for bigotry and labor abuses against Mexican-Americans in the U.S. during the same period. And, in that same period, La Prensa supported Mexican-American non-union labor, notably in industries grappling with labor disputes. In one case, La Prensa supported Mexican-American labor at Bethlehem Steel in Pittsburgh in 1923. The April 17, 1923, edition of La Prensa announced that (i) a train left that day for Bethlehem, Pennsylvania, with 400 workers aboard, (ii) 400 more were to leave on April 22, 1923, and (iii) 300 workers had left two weeks earlier.

Third generation progressive political influence in the U.S.

Many descendants of La Prensa journalists became leading exponents of progressive politics in America, including Lozano's granddaughter, Monica C. Lozano and Leonides González's son, Henry B. Gonzalez.

Loyalty to Mexico

Lozano contended that all Mexicans were the same and urged them to return and rebuild their homeland. One of his editors, Federico Allen Hinojosa, published a book in 1940 in which he asserted that members of the El México de Afuera – the title of the book which translates to "Exiles from Mexico" – had distinguished themselves by not only retaining their faith (in Catholicism) and devotion (to Mexican nationalism) that their non-exiled Mexican counterparts had lost, they achieved a reconquest of the lost lands that the United States had taken from Mexico in the 19th century. While La Prensa articulated the political views of its publisher, it contained news and features about the Mexican homeland that appealed to Mexicans in the U.S. who harbored a wide spectrum of political views.

Provocative editorials towards the Mexican Revolutionary Party

On November 6, 1934, the Associated Press reported that distribution of La Prensa and La Opinión was barred from Mexico by the government because of articles criticizing the ousting of Catholic officials from government over opposition against the Revolutionary Party-controlled government's plan to contest so-called Catholic aggression and to, among other things, transfer the role of education to the government. Archbishop Pascual Diaz of Mexico had gone into hiding.

Publishing influence in the Southwest

San Antonio became the publishing center for Hispanics in the Southwest, and housed more Spanish-language publishing houses than any other city in the United States. During the 1920s and 1930s, San Antonio was home to:

- Casa Editorial Lozano, founded around 1916 by Ignacio E. Lozano, Sr., published hundreds of titles a year during its peak and was the largest publishing establishment owned by a Hispanic in the United States
- Viola Novelty Company, founded and owned by Pascual Viola (1898–1946), published two satirical weekly newspapers, El Vacílon and El Fandango, active from 1916 to 1927
- Whitt Printing Co., founded in 1914 by descendants of an English officer, endured its latter years only as a printing establishment; it dissolved in 1977 under the heirs Homer Whitt, Sr. (1905–1980) and Allen Hall
- Librería Española, surviving its latter years only as a bookstore; it closed in 1999 as San Antonio's last full-service Spanish-language bookstore
- Artes Graficas

Influence in fine arts

La Prensa encouraged readers to attend the opera, particularly the Chicago Civic Opera when it was in town. It also urged readers to listen to classical music on the radio, "Música Simfónica". In an apparent attempt to cultivate Mexican heritage, La Prensa urged its readers to attend Mexican films, lectures by Mexican and Spanish intellectuals, and theater. Many Mexican-Americans, especially rico exiles, wanted to preserve their national heritage, Lo Mexicano, whereas lower income Mexican-Americans preferred to create their own cultural traditions.

As an example of La Prensa's influence on performing artists, internationally acclaimed Mexican violinist Silvestre Revueltas had been part of a fine arts movement in Mexico that rose to world rank. Revueltas' trio performed at San Antonio's Teatro Nacional on April 8, 1926 – a concert sponsorship by El Club Mexicano de Bellas Artes, San Antonio, of which Lozano's wife, Alicia Elizondo de Lozano, was an officer. Members of the Revueltas trio included soprano Lupe Medina de Ortega (née Guadalupe Medina; 1892–1953) and the pianist Francisco Agea Hermosa (1900–1970), for whom it was their U.S. debut. Revueltas took-up residence and performed in San Antonio from about 1926 to 1929. His decision to do so was influenced by lavish reviews in the San Antonio Express and La Prensa.

Attitudes towards modern women

In a treatise about women at La Prensa, the scholar Nancy A. Aguirre, PhD, states that La Prensa was critical of women seeking men's roles, particularly rica (rich) women.

Influence on popular culture

Dances by Bob Wills and his Texas Playboys were advertised in La Prensa in the 1940s and were well-attended by Mexican-Americans.

Attitudes towards fashion

In a 1940 description of a zoot suit, a writer for La Prensa gave a sarcastic description:

They wear a jacket that is over 37-inches long, with three buttons of which only two are used, the shoulders are heavily padded, the waist is tight: the legs are 26 inches wide, but the pant cuffs measure only 14 inches. The pants, seen from north to south, generally go almost to the armpit, but the watch hangs from a chain that reaches to the knees.

— Excerpt (translated) from La Prensa, 1940

Management

Ignacio Lozano and his wife, Alicia Elizondo Lozano, operated both papers. After Ignacio's death from cancer in 1953, his son, Ignacio E. Lozano, Jr., at age 26, took over as publisher of La Opinión and his widow returned to San Antonio to continue operations, with Leonides González (1875–1966), La Prensa's longtime business manager. González was the father of Henry B. Gonzalez, who in 1961, became a U.S. Congressman. He was also the grandfather of Charlie Gonzalez, who in 1999, also became a U.S. Congressman.

1957 suspension of La Prensa

González retired in 1957 and on June 16 (Sunday), 1957, the paper suspended operation. It reappeared on July 11, 1957, as a weekly tabloid. On the same day, González announced his resignation.

From then until 1959, La Prensa continued as a weekly under Lozano management with Ignacio E. Lozano, Jr., as director, Alica Lozano as manager, and Manuel Ruiz Ibañez as editor-in-chief. The last issue under the Lozano family was published on May 29, 1959, volume 47, number 15.

1959 sale of La Prensa

La Prensa was sold to Texas millionaire-philanthropist Dudley Tarleton Dougherty (1924–1978) and the economist Eduardo Grenas-Gooding (1887–1968), formerly of Colombia, Mexico, and Cuba. The first issue under the new owners was published on June 4, 1959, as a weekly. The new owners announced their intent to restore publication as a daily in September 1959 and extensive expansion into Central and South America, but neither ever materialized.

On December 3, 1959, Dougherty appointed Ed Harllee (né Arthur Edward Harllee; 1929–2010) as general manager of La Prensa. Raymond Palmer Orr (born 1924) continued as executive editor.

December 10, 1959

A pilot film made for television, Gringo, produced Ron Gorton in co-operation with La Prensa Publishing Co. premiered in San Antonio on December 10, 1959.

1960 relocation of printing press

Beginning August 4, 1960, La Prensa moved its printing to facilities of the Seguin Gazette, in Seguin, Texas, owned by former San Antonio newspaperman John Clifton Taylor Jr. (1925–2014). Ed Castillo remained as managing editor and Octavio R. Costa remained as general manager of what then was 10 employees.

1961 sale of La Prensa

On May 11, 1961, Robert Turgot Brinsmade (né Robert Turgot Brinsmade; 1913–1994), an American international lawyer, purchased La Prensa and announced that he would restore it to a daily publication. Ed Castillo, who had been the managing editor since November 1959, remained in that role. Brinsmade remained owner and publisher of La Prensa until its demise in 1963.

His father, Robert Bruce Brinsmade, PhD (1873–1936), was an American mining engineer, who through his work in mining, became a labor rights advocate and exponent of the economist Henry George. Robert Turgot Brinsmade's maternal uncle, Harry Steenbock, PhD (1886–1967), was a biochemistry professor at the University of Wisconsin, inventor, and one of the discoverers of vitamins D, A and B.

Brinsmade, who had been practicing law in Caracas, admitted that he collaborated in the overthrow of Acción Democrática, the Venezuelan political party that governed from 1945 to 1948, when it ended by a coup d'état. He believed that Rómulo Betancourt, who became president in 1945 by coup d'état, and Acción Democrática, intended to set up a Marxist form of government in Venezuela by force of arms, if necessary, and justified his actions, and indicated that his actions had the support of the U.S. government. Brinsmade was roundly informed by Ambassador Walter J. Donnelly in 1948 that he had damaged long-standing U.S. interests by compromising its reputation for neutrality and abstention from political activities. The U.S. Department of State expressed "strong disapproval" of his involvement.

Robert Turgot Brinsmade married three times. He was a widower from his 1939 marriage to Mollye Catherine Johnson (1920–1952) and a 1955 divorcee from his 1953 marriage to Ruth Elizabeth Ericsson (born 1914), who had been, in 1941, selected in New York by John Robert Powers to be a Miss Subways model, which drew 258 marriage proposals, all of which she rejected. In 1961, he married Suzanne Joy Metz (maiden; born 1934) in Mexico City after having spent time in Caracas, Venezuela, as owner and publisher of the newspaper La Calle ("The Street"). Brinsgate and his wife settled in Houston. He had been a founding shareholder in 1948 in Sivensa (Siderúrgica Venezolana, S.A.), a Venezuelan steel company.

Final issue and involuntary liquidation of La Prensa

The last issue of La Prensa, by then a bilingual tabloid, was published on January 31, 1963, just two weeks short of the paper's 50th anniversary. In a final blow, the Internal Revenue Service seized La Prensa's assets for back taxes and sold them at auction on March 28, 1963.

== Selected personnel ==
Publishers

- Ignacio Eugenio Lozano, Sr. (1886–1953), founder and publisher from 1913 to 1953
- Alicia Lozano (née Alicia Elizondo; 1899–1984), wife of Ignacio Lozano, Sr., publisher from 1953 to 1959
- Dudley Tarleton Dougherty (1924–1978) and Eduardo Grenas-Gooding (born 1887–1968), co-publishers from 1959 to 1961; Dougherty was the son of a first-generation Texas-Irish Mexican Citizen
- Roberto Brinsmade (né Robert Turgot Brinsmade; 1914–1994), publisher from 1961 to 1963

Editors

- Teodoro Torres (es) (1891–1944), considered the father of Mexican journalism
- Alberto P. Whitt, Sr. (1900–1961), was editor-in-chief for 32 years
- Jose G. González (1889–1964), who had been married to Concepcion Lozano, who predeceased him
- George Edward Farenthold (1915–2000), who, from 1950 to 1985, was married to political activist Frances Farenthold, cousin of Dudley Tarleton Dougherty

Managing editors

- Delis Negron (né Delis Pedro Lopez Negron; 1901–1956), city editor in the late 1940s, then managing editor from about 1948 to 1954
- Ed Castillo (né Edward Severo Castillo; 1916–1996), formerly a columnist with the San Antonio Light, became managing editor of La Prensa in November 1959
- Manuel Ruiz Ibañez (1910–1995), editor, the managing editor up until 1959

Business manager

- Leonides González (1875–1966), a Mexican exile, was managing editor for more than 40 years; and held key executive positions, including the position of administrator when La Prensa was founded

Mechanical staff

- José Rómulo Munguía Torres (aka Rómulo Munguía; 1885–1975) fled Mexico in 1926, settling in San Antonio; Lozano hired him as a linotype operator and rapidly promoted him to mechanical superintendent He was the grandfather of Henry Cisneros.

Contributors

- Alonso Sandoval Perales (1898–1960)

Writers

- Nemesio García Naranjo (es) (1883–1962)
- Victoriano Salado Álvarez (1867–1931)
- Querido Moheno (1873–1933)
- José María Lozano (1878–1933)
- José Ascensión Reyes (1872–1935), writer and administrator
- Reynaldo Esparza Martínez, former governor of Puebla, Mexico
- José Fernández Rojas, Sr. (1885–1950), chief editorial writer from 1922 to 1932
- José Fernández Rojas, Jr.
- Federico Allen Hinojosa (1888–1947), city editor for more than 20 years
- Regino Hernández Llergo (born 1898)
- José Pagés Llergo (es) (1910–1989), cousin of Regino Hernández Llergo
- Ignacio F. Herrerías (1906–1944), founding publisher of the Mexican newspaper Novedades de México who was shot to death by Florencio Zamarripa (1920–1965), chief of a strike committee, after the end of a strike; Herrerías was the grandfather of the opera soprano Betty Fabila
- Genaro Montiel Olvera
- José Ruiz Ibañez (1883–1938)
- Manuel Ruiz Ibañez (1910–1995), editor
- Raúl Cortez (1905–1971), reporter for La Prensa before founding KCOR and KCOR-TV
- José Vasconcelos (1882–1959)
- Romulo Munguia, Sr. (1885–1975), writer and superintendent of the printing shop
- Martín Luis Guzmán (1887–1976), reporter
- Benjamin Franklin Cuéllar (1886–1958), editor, was a Mexican exile
- Star Castillo (né Eduardo Alvarez del Castillo; 1911–1958), Laredo journalist, and once a stringer for La Prensa
- Oswaldo Alarcón (1902–1966), sports editor
- Andrea Villarreal (1881–1963)
- Leonides Gonzales, general manager
- Amado Ramírez (né Amado Madrigal Ramírez; 1913–1973), editor, who in December 1963, founded Noticiero, and later was the Chicago editor for Prensa Libre, became a U.S. naturalized citizen in 1966
- J. Xavier Mondragón, for 18 years, from 1913 to 1930, Mondrabón was the Chicago correspondent for La Prensa

Poets

- Américo Paredes (1915–1999), when he was 20, published poems in a literary supplement of La Prensa, Lunes literarios (Literary Mondays), published on Mondays, running from about 1935 to 1940. On October 18, 1937, La Prensa ran a two-page excerpt of his work, Cantos de Adolescencia
- María Enriqueta Camarillo (1872–1968) (es) ("Ivan Moakowski")

== Selected archival access to La Prensa ==
- Online: GenealogyBank.com (fee required)
  February 13, 1913, to May 28, 1959
- Microfilm: Benson Latin American Collection, Perry–Castañeda Library, University of Texas at Austin; OCLC 9505681
- Microfilm; OCLC 32456956
  February 13, 1913, to May 28, 1959
  Microfilm Center, Inc.
  241 reels
  positive; 35 mm
- Balch Institute for Ethnic Studies

=== Other resources ===
- "Index to la Prensa" (for the 1913 and 1914), (manuscript), researched by María Antonia Chávez Saldaña (ed.) (1934); OCLC 30333562
- Almanaque ilustrado de "La Prensa"; OCLC 10204843
- Almanaque ilustrado de los periódicos Lozano para 1943: "La Prensa" (San Antonio, Texas), "La Opinión" (Los Angeles, Calif.) (1943); OCLC 651456650

== Statements of ownership ==
March 1, 1916

- Publisher, Ignacio E. Lozano
- Editor, Ignacio E. Lozano
- Managing Editor, F. de. P. Venzor
- Business Manager, Jose G. Gonzalez
- Owner, Ignacio E. Lozano
- Bondholders and other creditors holding more than 1% of the total notes: zero
- Circulation: 8,325

April 1, 1919

- Publisher, Ignacio E. Lozano
- Editor, Ignacio E. Lozano
- Managing Editor, Teodoro Torres, Jr.
- Business Managers, F. de. P. Venzor, Jose G. Gonzalez
- Owner, Ignacio E. Lozano
- Bondholders and other creditors holding more than 1% of the total notes: zero
- Circulation: 12,888

October 1, 1920

- Publisher, Ignacio E. Lozano
- Editor, Ignacio E. Lozano
- Managing Editor, Teodoro Torres, Jr.
- Business Managers: Leonides Gonzalez and Jose G. Gonzalez
- Owner, Ignacio E. Lozano
- Bondholders and other creditors holding more than 1% of the total notes: zero
- Circulation: 17,846

April 1, 1922

- Publisher, Ignacio E Lozano
- Editor, Ignacio E. Lozano
- Managing Editor, Federico Allen Hinojosa
- Business Managers: Leonides Gonzalez and Jose G. Gonzalez
- Owner, Ignacio E. Lozano
- Circulation: 13,166.

October 1, 1927

- Publisher, Ignacio E. Lozano
- Managing Editor, Federico Allen Hinojosa
- Business Manager, Leonides Gonzalez
- Owner: Ignacio E. Lozano
- Bondholders and other creditors holding more than 1% of the total notes: zero
- Circulation: 19,621

October 1, 1934

- Publisher, Ignacio E. Lozano
- Managing Editor, Federico Allen Hinojosa
- Business Manager, Leonides Gonzalez
- Owner: Lozono Newspapers, Inc.
  Ignncio E. Lozano
  Alicia E. de Lozano
- Bondholders and other creditors holding more than 1% of the total notes: zero
- Circulation: 9,015.

September 30, 1941

- Publisher, Ignacio E. Lozano
- Managing Editor, Manuel R. Vidal, Jr.
- Business Manager, Leonides Gonzalez
- Owner: Lozono Newspapers, Inc.
  Ignncio E. Lozano
  Alicia E. de Lozano
- Bondholders and other creditors holding more than 1% of the total notes: zero
- Circulation: 9,015.

October 1, 1958, operational personnel of La Prensa was composed of:

- Publisher, Alicia E. Lozano
- Managing Editor, Manuel Ruiz Ibañez
- Business Manager, Alicia E. Lozano
- Alicia E. Lozano, et al., owners under the structure of a partnership
- Bondholders and other creditors holding more than 1% of the total notes: zero
- Circulation: 8,704
