= Ignacio E. Lozano =

Ignacio E. Lozano may refer to:

- Ignacio E. Lozano, Sr. (1886–1953), Mexican-American journalist
- Ignacio E. Lozano, Jr. (born 1927), American journalist and former United States Ambassador to El Salvador
