= Alejandro Lozano =

Alejandro Lozano may refer to:

- Alejandro Lozano (artist) (1939–2003), Spanish artist, painter and mosaic muralist
- Alejandro Lozano (director) (born 1975), Mexican film director known for directing Matando Cabos and Sultanes del Sur
- Alejandro Lozano (footballer) (born 2005), Spanish football winger
- Alejandro Suárez Lozano (born 1980), Spanish film director and writer
