= La Raza (Chicago) =

US periodical

- Front page of La Raza
- Type: Weekly newspaper
- Owner: ImpreMedia
- Editor: Jesús Del Toro
- Founded: 1970; 56 years ago
- Language: Spanish
- Headquarters: Chicago, Illinois
- Website: laraza.com

La Raza is a Spanish newspaper and news website, published in Chicago, Illinois by La Raza Chicago, Inc. It is a free newspaper distributed in Chicago and its metropolitan area, mostly directly to homes in Hispanic neighborhoods and also in street boxes and stores. La Raza reports and informs on key issues for the Chicago Latino community, with special focus on the challenges, successes, and possibilities of the city's Hispanic population and civic organizations.

== History ==
Founded in 1970 by Alfredo Torres de Jesús, in 1972 it was purchased by César Dovalina and later, in late 1983 by Luis Heber Rossi, a businessman and music promoter in Chicago. During Rossi's tenure, La Raza became one of the most recognized Spanish publications in the United States.

Since November 2004, La Raza has been a part of ImpreMedia, publisher of the Spanish newspapers La Opinión, El Diario NY, and other digital properties.

La Raza is part of the Chicago Independent Media Alliance and has participated in projects led by the Institute for Nonprofit News such as Lens on Lightfoot (which analyzed the first year of the administration of Chicago Mayor Lori Lightfoot). It is also part of the Solving for Chicago journalism collaborative led by the Local Media Association.

== Reception ==
La Raza has been recognized on several occasions as the Best Hispanic Weekly of the US by the National Association of Hispanic Publications' Jose Martí Awards, among dozens of other awards granted by that organization.

The newspaper was also recognized in 2015 as one of "10 Newspapers That Do It Right" by Editor & Publisher magazine and has received grants in support of its journalism awarded by the Field Foundation of Illinois, the Robert R. McCormick Foundation, the Chicago Community Trust, the Facebook Journalism Project/Lenfest Institute, the Facebook Sustainability Accelerator/International Center for Journalists and the Google News Initiative.

Jesús Del Toro is La Raza's current director and Editor in Chief. In 2023, Del Toro was named NAHP's Latino Publisher of the Year.

== External links section ==
- La Raza website

== See also ==
- List of Spanish-language newspapers published in the United States
