= Nestor Fantini =

Argentine-American educator and human rights activist

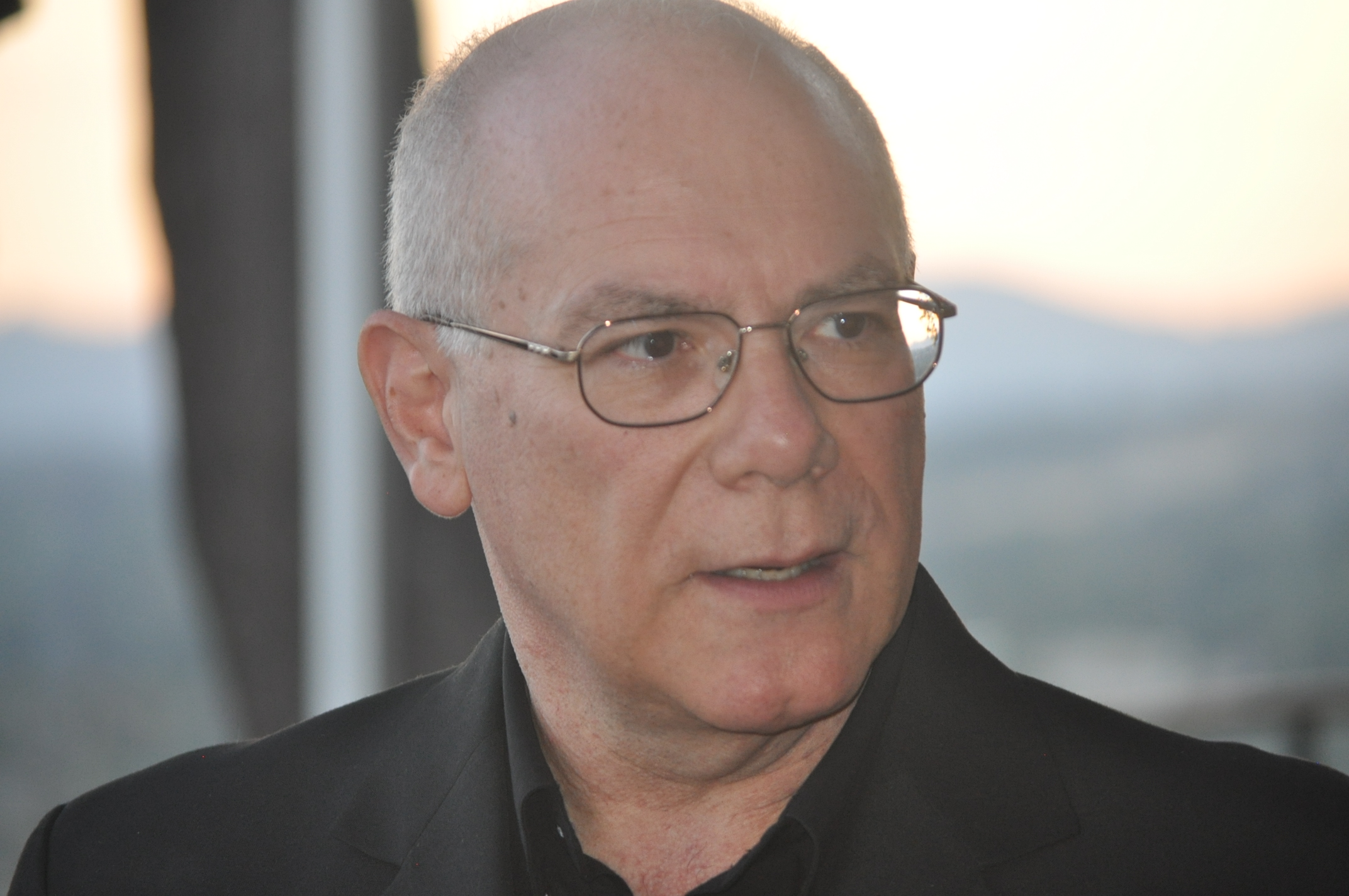
- Nestor Fantini in 2016
- Born: 11 May 1953 (age 72); Cordoba, Argentina
- Education: University of Toronto

Nestor Manuel Fantini (born May 11, 1953) is an Argentine-American educator, former political prisoner, and human rights activist. Fantini was a pro-democracy student activist during Argentina’s Dirty War and was imprisoned for his political opposition to the military dictatorship that had overthrown the democratically elected government in 1976 and waged a campaign of state-sponsored terrorism. During his detention, he was adopted as a Prisoner of Conscience by Amnesty International and his ordeal was portrayed in a 2019 documentary film produced by Amnesty. As a human rights advocate, he is a frequent speaker to organizations in the United States and Canada on topics of the rule of law, civil liberties, and the impact of social activism.

After a career as an educator and a professor of sociology, Fantini served as an elected member of the Neighborhood Councils of Los Angeles between 2008 and 2016 where he served as an education committee chair. As an activist and cultural promoter within the Los Angeles Latino community, he was the principal organizer of La Peña Literaria La Luciérnaga and has led numerous cultural and political programs in Los Angeles. He has written for the Huffington Post, La Opinión, and in 2018 was named editor of the online Spanish-language newsmagazine HispanicLA.com and is the author of two fiction books.
