= 2014 California State Board of Equalization election =

2014 California State Board of Equalization elections
- November 4, 2014

All 4 seats on the California State Board of Equalization
	Majority party	Minority party
Party	Democratic	Republican
Last election	2	2
Seats before	2	2
Seats won	2	2
Seat change	Steady	Steady
Popular vote	3,674,237	3,193,444
Percentage	53.5%	46.5%

The 2014 California State Board of Equalization elections took place on November 4, 2014, to elect all four seats of the State Board of Equalization, with the non-partisan blanket primary election taking place on June 3, 2014.

== Overview ==
California State Board of Equalization primary election, 2014
Party	Votes		Candidates	Advancing to general	Seats contesting
Party	No.	%	Candidates	Advancing to general	Seats contesting
Democratic Party	2,003,631	55.22%	4	4	4
Republican Party	1,624,255	44.77%	8	4	4
Third party	368	0.01%	3	0	0
Total	3,628,254	100.00%	15	8	Steady

California State Board of Equalization general election, 2014
Party	Candidates	Votes		Seats			
Party	Candidates	No.	%	Before	After	+/–	%
Democratic Party	4	3,674,237	53.50%	2	2	Steady	50.0%
Republican Party	4	3,193,444	46.50%	2	2	Steady	50.0%
Total	8	6,867,681	100.0%	4	4	Steady	100.00%

Popular vote
Democratic	53.5%
Republican	46.5%

Board of Equalization seats
Democratic	50.0%
Republican	50.0%

Board of Equalization District	Incumbent	Party	Elected officeholder	Party
1st	Betty Yee	Democratic	George Runner	Republican
2nd	George Runner	Republican	Fiona Ma	Democratic
3rd	Michelle Steel	Republican	Jerome Horton	Democratic
4th	Jerome Horton	Democratic	Diane Harkey	Republican

== District 1 ==
The incumbent was Republican George Runner, who was elected to the 2nd district in 2010 with 50.0% of the vote. He was running for reelection. Runner was redistricted to the 1st district following the 2010 Census.

=== Candidates ===
- Chris Parker (D), tax professional/educator
- George Runner (R), incumbent member of the Board of Equalization

=== Results ===
California's 1st Board of Equalization district, 2014
Primary election
Party	Candidate	Votes	%
Republican	George Runner (incumbent)	608,637	59.8
Democratic	Chris Parker	408,343	40.2
Total votes		1,016,980	100.0
General election
Republican	George Runner (incumbent)	984,604	57.8
Democratic	Chris Parker	718,129	42.2
Total votes		1,702,733	100.0
Republican gain from Democratic			

== District 2 ==
The incumbent was Democrat Betty Yee, who was elected in 2006 and 2010, meaning she was term-limited and ineligible to run for reelection.

=== Candidates ===
- Fiona Ma (D), member of the California State Assembly (2006-2012), former member of the San Francisco Board of Supervisors (2002–2006)
- James E. Theis (R), organic foods manager

=== Results ===
California's 2nd Board of Equalization district, 2014
Primary election
Party	Candidate	Votes	%
Democratic	Fiona Ma	876,378	68.9
Republican	James E. Theis	396,241	31.1
Total votes		1,272,619	100.0
General election
Democratic	Fiona Ma	1,448,657	68.7
Republican	James E. Theis	660,973	31.3
Total votes		2,109,630	100.0
Democratic gain from Republican			

== District 3 ==
The incumbent was Democrat Jerome Horton, who was appointed in 2009 and elected in 2010. He was running for reelection. Horton was redistricted from the 4th district following the 2010 Census.

=== Candidates ===
- Jose E. Castaneda (L) (write-in)
- Jerome Horton (D), incumbent member of the Board of Equalization
- G. Rick Marshall (R) (write-in)
- Eric S. Moren (P&F) (write-in)
- Jan B. Tucker (P&F) (write-in)

=== Results ===
California's 3rd Board of Equalization district, 2014
Primary election
Party	Candidate	Votes	%
Democratic	Jerome Horton (incumbent)	402,244	99.5
Republican	G. Rick Marshall (write-in)	1,849	0.5
Libertarian	Jose E. Castaneda (write-in)	198	0.0
Peace and Freedom	Eric S. Moren (write-in)	134	0.0
Peace and Freedom	Jan B. Tucker (write-in)	36	0.0
Total votes		404,461	100.0
General election
Democratic	Jerome Horton (incumbent)	858,471	62.4
Republican	G. Rick Marshall	517,287	37.6
Total votes		1,375,758	100.0
Democratic gain from Republican			

== District 4 ==
The incumbent was Republican Michelle Steel, who was elected in 2006 and 2010, meaning she was ineligible to run for reelection.

=== Candidates ===
- Lewis Da Silva (R), accountant/realtor
- Diane Harkey (R), member of the California State Assembly (2008-2014)
- Shirley Horton (R), development director
- John F. Kelly (R), businessman
- Nader Shahatit (D), government auditor
- Van Tran (R), taxpayer advocate/businessman

=== Results ===
California's 4th Board of Equalization district, 2014
Primary election
Party	Candidate	Votes	%
Republican	Diane Harkey	324,642	34.8
Democratic	Nader Shahatit	316,666	33.9
Republican	John F. Kelly	101,836	10.9
Republican	Van Tran	84,162	9.0
Republican	Shirley Horton	74,794	8.0
Republican	Lewis Da Silva	32,094	3.4
Total votes		934,194	100.0
General election
Republican	Diane Harkey	1,030,580	61.4
Democratic	Nader Shahatit	648,980	38.6
Total votes		1,679,560	100.0
Republican gain from Democratic			
