= Adrienne Elrod =

President, Elrod Strategies; Analyst, MSNBC

Elrod in 2019

Adrienne Kimbro Elrod is an American political operative and public servant. She has worked for multiple Democratic elected officials and candidates, including roles in Clinton and Biden presidential administrations.

== Early life and education ==
Elrod was raised in Arkansas. She is a graduate of Texas Christian University, where she was a member of the Delta Delta Delta sorority.

== Career ==
Beginning in 1998, Elrod worked in the Clinton administration, working in the White House Office of Intergovernmental Affairs and the Department of Housing and Urban Development.

Elrod took her first job on Capitol Hill in 2003, working as communications director for Rep. Mike Ross.

From 2008 to 2013, Elrod served as Chief of Staff for Representative Loretta Sanchez.

Elrod was the Director of Talent and External Affairs for then-President-Elect Joe Biden's inauguration in 2021.

Elrod served in the Biden Administration as Director of External and Government Affairs for CHIPS for America (within the National Institute for Standards and Technology) at the Department of Commerce under then-Secretary Gina Raimondo. In April 2024, Elrod joined the Biden campaign as a senior advisor and spokesperson. When Biden dropped out of the race, she continued in the same role for the Harris campaign.

In March 2025, Elrod founded a political strategy firm with fellow Democratic operative Rufus Gifford.

Elrod is also a frequent MS NOW contributor.
