= Loretta Sanchez =

American politician (born 1960)

Loretta Sánchez
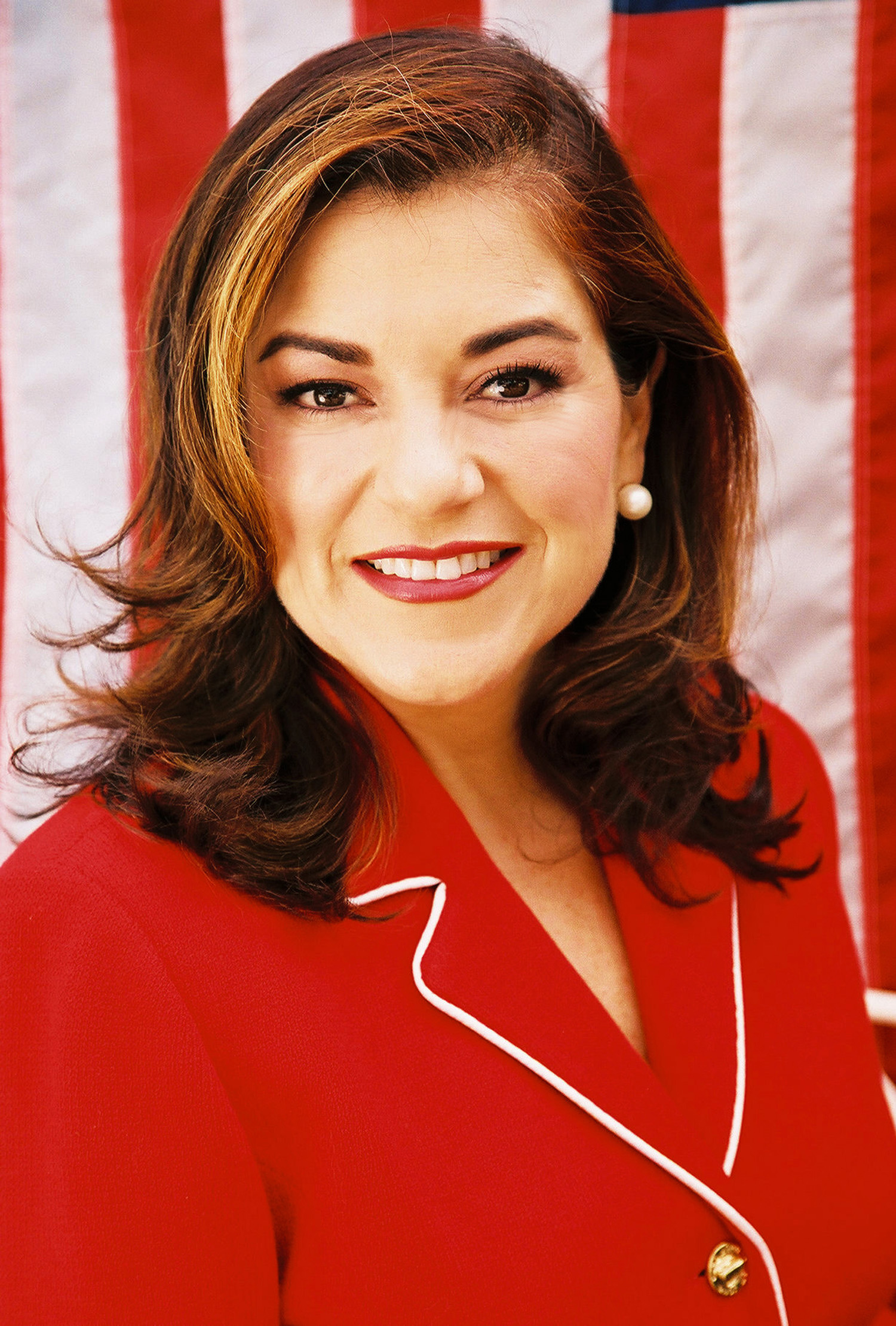
- Official portrait, 2007

Member of the U.S. House of Representatives from California
- In office January 3, 1997 – January 3, 2017
- Preceded by: Bob Dornan
- Succeeded by: Lou Correa
- Constituency: 46th district (1997–2003, 2013–2017); 47th district (2003–2013)

Personal details
- Born: Loretta Lorna Sánchez; January 7, 1960 (age 66) Lynwood, California, U.S.
- Party: Republican (before 1992); Democratic (1992–present)
- Spouses: Stephen Brixey (m. 1989; div. 2004); Jack Einwechter (m. 2011)
- Relatives: Linda Sánchez (sister)
- Education: Chapman University (BA); American University (MBA)
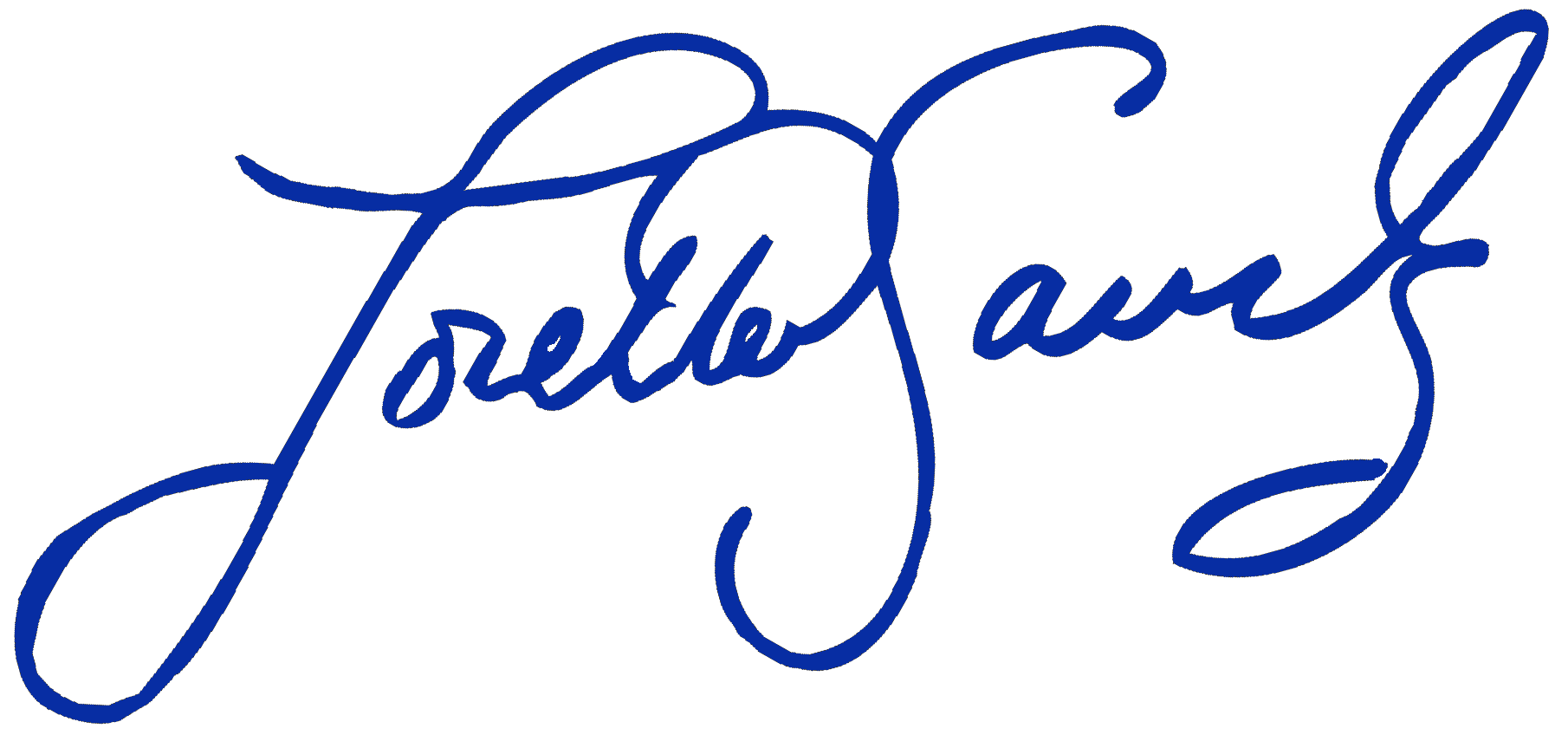
- Signature

Loretta Lorna Sanchez (born January 7, 1960) is an American politician who served in the United States House of Representatives from 1997 to 2017, representing parts of central Orange County, California. A member of the Democratic Party, she was first elected in 1996, when she defeated long-serving Republican U.S. Representative Bob Dornan by fewer than 1,000 votes. During her time in the House of Representatives, Sanchez was a member of the Blue Dog Coalition of moderate-to-conservative Democrats.

Sanchez chose not to run for re-election to the House in 2016, instead opting to run in the state's U.S. Senate race. She was defeated in the general election by fellow Democrat, California Attorney General and future U.S. Vice President Kamala Harris, 61.6% to 38.4%.

She is the sister of Linda Sánchez, who currently represents California's 38th congressional district in the U.S. House of Representatives.

== Early life and education ==
Sanchez was born in Lynwood, California, and graduated from Katella High School in Anaheim in 1978. Her father was a unionized machinist, and her mother worked as a secretary. Her Mexican-immigrant parents had seven children, one of whom—Linda Sánchez—also served in Congress, making them the first (and, as of December 2023, the only) sisters to serve simultaneously in Congress.

Loretta Sanchez joined the United Food and Commercial Workers when she worked as an ice cream server in high school and received a union scholarship to college. She received her undergraduate degree in economics from Chapman College in Orange in 1982, obtained her MBA from American University in Washington, D.C. in 1984, and was a financial analyst for defense contractor Booz Allen Hamilton until entering the House. Sanchez describes herself as growing up a "shy, quiet girl" who did not speak English. She credits government with much of her success in public life.

== U.S. House of Representatives ==
=== Committee assignments ===
- Committee on Armed Services
  - Subcommittee on Oversight and Investigations
  - Subcommittee on Strategic Forces (Ranking Member)
  - Subcommittee on Emerging Threats and Capabilities
- Committee on Homeland Security
  - Subcommittee on Border and Maritime Security
  - Subcommittee on Counterterrorism and Intelligence

=== Caucus memberships ===
- Congressional Hispanic Caucus
- Congressional Human Rights Caucus
- International Conservation Caucus
- Sportsmen's Caucus

=== Congressional Hispanic Caucus ===
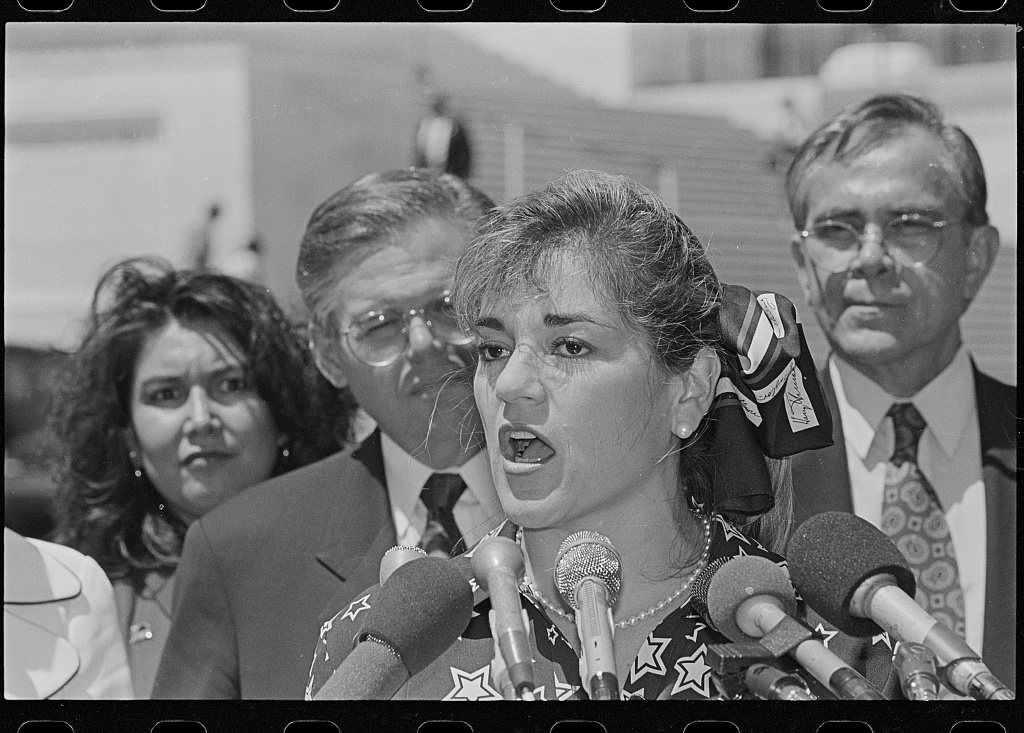
Sanchez speaking at a Congressional Hispanic Caucus press conference outside the Capitol in 1997

In February 2006, Sanchez withdrew from the Congressional Hispanic Caucus's political action committee, along with five other members, because the caucus chairman, Joe Baca, authorized political contributions to members of his family who were running for state and local offices in California.

Sanchez and other CHC members also claim that Baca was improperly elected chairman of the caucus in November 2006 because the vote failed to use secret ballots, as required in the group's bylaws. On January 31, 2007, Sanchez quit the CHC because she claimed that Baca repeatedly treated the group's female members with disrespect. Other female lawmakers have made the same complaint about Baca. In the election for caucus chairman, only one female member of the 23-member caucus voted to support Baca's candidacy.

According to Sanchez, as well as Linda Sánchez (her sister), and Hilda Solis, Baca called Loretta Sanchez "a whore" while speaking to other lawmakers. Baca denied the charge. Politico reported that Sanchez claimed California Assembly Speaker Fabian Núñez heard the comment from Baca and repeated it to Sanchez, yet Núñez claimed not to recall any such comment. Sanchez, however, claimed after the article was published that she had never mentioned Núñez to Politico.

== Political positions ==
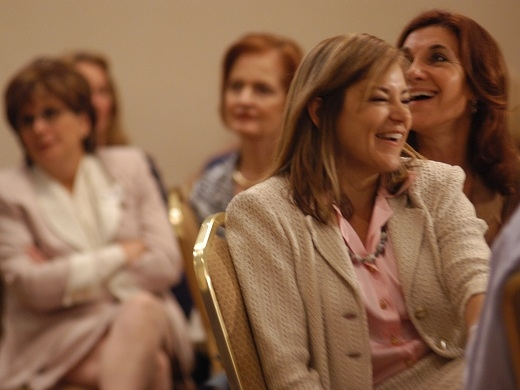
Loretta Sanchez at her annual "Women of Distinction" Event

Sanchez has stated she is a "moderate" Democrat, but in 2009, Sanchez had a 'zero' approval rating from the American Conservative Union.

She represented a district in Orange County, long a bastion of suburban conservatism, and is a member of the Blue Dog Coalition and the New Democrat Coalition; she reportedly voted with Nancy Pelosi 97.8% of the time during the 111th Congress.

Sanchez is known for her interests in education, crime, economic development, and protections for senior citizens.

National Journal rated her votes in 2006 in three areas: Economic, Social, and Foreign. The ratings are: Economic = 71 liberal/28 conservative; Social = 80 liberal/19 conservative; Foreign = 70 liberal/28 conservative.

=== Education ===
Sanchez staunchly opposed the Republicans' Head Start program overhaul in the 108th Congress, invoking her experience growing up poor and challenged by a speech impediment. During debate on the bill, she said:

I know about these kids, because I am one of those kids ... It hurts to hear you talk about how we are not successful, or how we are losers. But we are very successful. We have had a lot of successes with Head Start.

Sanchez has asserted that conservative Republicans are not committed to improving public education. When President Bush's 2003 budget proposal threatened to cut education grants, she responded:

If he can run deficits for the military, then he can run deficits to educate our children.

=== Armed services, social issues, and labor ===
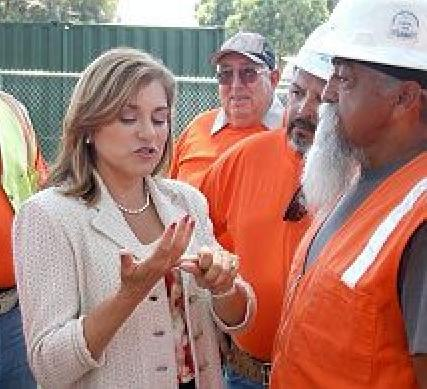
Loretta Sanchez meeting with union leaders

Sanchez was the second-ranking Democrat on the Homeland Security Committee and a senior member of the Armed Services Committee, and the most senior woman on that committee. Loretta has fought to reform both the law and culture of the U.S. military relating to investigation of sexual crimes, prosecution of sex offenders and care of sexual assault victims. Her leadership contributed to a decision to examine the problem of sexual assault at the military service academies, which revealed that the problem was much more prevalent than previously thought. As a result, she led the fight to change sexual assault provisions of the Uniform Code of Military Justice. In early 2011, Sanchez introduced a bill requiring the United States Department of Homeland Security to issue rules governing searches and seizures of the laptops, cellphones, and other electronic devices of American citizens returning to the U.S. from abroad.

Sanchez is regarded as a liberal on social issues. She voted against a constitutional ban on same-sex marriage and supports abortion rights. She also sought to reverse the ban on abortions at overseas military bases and installations. In August 2000, Sanchez refused to relocate a political fundraiser she had planned at the Playboy Mansion in California. As a result, Democratic National Committee chairman Joe Andrew cancelled her scheduled speaking role at the Democratic National Convention. Sanchez's address was reinstated just before the convention, when she agreed to relocate her fundraiser to Universal Studios.

=== Foreign policy ===
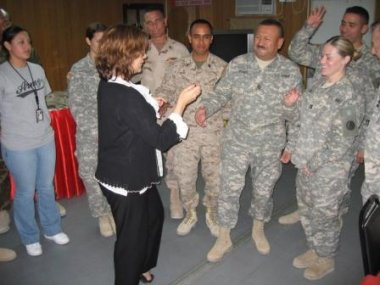
Loretta Sanchez visiting U.S. troops in Kuwait during Easter

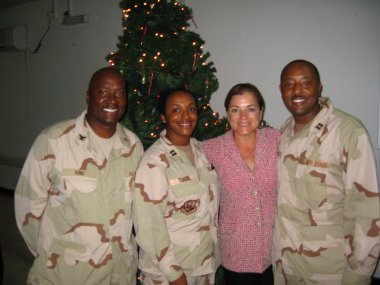
Loretta Sanchez visiting troops in Africa

According to Congressional Quarterly, "In 2002, Sanchez voted against reviving fast-track procedures for congressional action on trade deals. And, coming from a district with one of the largest ethnically Vietnamese communities outside Vietnam, she voted against a trade agreement with Vietnam, saying that political and human rights conditions in that country needed improvement. Her outspokenness led the Hanoi regime to refuse to allow her into the country late in 2004 when she applied for an entry visa to meet with dissidents." By April 2006, Sanchez had been denied a visa to visit Vietnam four times by the country's officials. In honor of International Human Rights Day, she joined a bipartisan group of 11 House Members that issued a letter to Vietnamese Prime Minister Nguyen Tan Dung calling for the release of two U.S. citizens arrested by the government of Vietnam.

On October 10, 2002, Sanchez was among the 133 members of the House who voted against authorizing the invasion of Iraq, but she has voted in favor of every appropriation bill for the war in Iraq. She opposed the troop surge in February 2007. On March 7, 2007, Sanchez led a female congressional delegation to visit troops in Iraq. This was her third visit to Iraq.

Sanchez has a strong record on supporting human rights and is a member of the bipartisan Congressional Human Rights Caucus. Two major votes include voting yes in 2001 to keep the Cuba travel ban until political prisoners are released, but later voting in 2009 to lift the travel ban unilaterally, and yes to acknowledge the Armenian genocide of the early 1900s. She voted to implement the 9/11 Commission Recommendations Act of 2007.

Sanchez has stated that she was briefly denied access to a United Airlines flight in October 2006 because her name appeared on a no-fly list set up after the September 11 attacks. Sanchez said she was instructed to check in with a United employee, who told her she was on the terrorist watch list. The employee asked her for identification.

In a December 2015 interview with Larry King, in response to his question about the threat of extremist groups within Islam, Sanchez suggested some experts estimate that "anywhere between 5 and 20 percent" of Muslims worldwide supported the creation of a Caliphate to overthrow the United States. Sanchez's comments, which came on the heels of both the recent Islamist terror attack in San Bernardino and 2016 Republican presidential candidate Donald Trump's call to temporarily ban Muslim immigration to the United States, were criticized as contributing to Anti-Muslim sentiment. Sanchez explained that she was merely echoing President Obama's remarks in his December 6, 2015 Oval Office Address wherein he stated: "Extremist ideology has spread within some Muslim communities. This is a real problem that Muslims must confront, without excuse." She further noted that she has a well-known record of defending the civil liberties of Muslim groups and that she believed most Muslims "are actually with us" in fighting Islamic extremism.

=== Homeland and cyber security ===
On September 13, 2016, the House Committee on Homeland Security unanimously approved two amendments authored by Sanchez to strengthen counterterrorism and cybersecurity programs.

The first bill, the Community Counterterrorism Preparedness Act, H.R. 5859, "establishes a grant program to help major metropolitan areas prepare for and respond to terror attacks that include active shooters." Sanchez's amendment requires that "unclassified threat information" be provided by the U.S. Department of Homeland Security (DHS) to grant applicants. According to Sanchez, "With this change, we not only provide needed funds to help regions prepare for attacks, we also give them critical tips and best practices to help them respond."

The second bill, the Cyber Preparedness Act of 2016, H.R. 5459, "clarifies that DHS grants for states and urban areas can be used for similar statewide initiatives." Sanchez's new amendment will increase the use of DHS grants in focusing on identifying threats and improving "cybersecurity sharing dissemination." According to Sanchez, "Given our increased reliance on cyber technology for commerce and critical infrastructure, and given the increasing sophistication of hackers who would do us harm, we must improve our efforts to identify, neutralize, and prevent cyberattacks."

=== Water policy ===
In 2009, Loretta Sanchez secured $49.7 million in federal funding for critical water projects in Orange County, including local dam building, water treatment, and conservation projects:

$49,310,000 for the continuing construction of the Santa Ana River Mainstem Project, including the Prado Dam. The U.S. Army Corps of Engineers labeled the Santa Ana River the worst flood threat west of the Mississippi River. Federal funding allowed for the construction of a new dam to help mitigate this threat, as well as the potential environmental impact imposed by the dam.

$2.870,000 for the Upper Newport Bay Ecosystem Restoration – Funding for this initiative helped manage sedimentation in the Upper Newport Bay by increasing the capacity of sediment basins, restoring and enhancing estuarine habitats, and improving educational and recreational opportunities.

$426,000 for the Westminster-East Garden Grove Watershed Study in Santa Ana to help the U.S. Army Corps of Engineers undertake a comprehensive study of the Westminster Watershed, to develop a rehabilitation plan for flood control, ecosystem restoration, recreation, and water quality solutions, including the East Garden Grove-Wintersburg Channel and the Bolsa Chica Flood Control Channel. This study helped bolster flood control efforts currently in place, and assisted with ecosystem restoration and overall water quality standards. Both projects were consistent with the U.S. Army Corps of Engineers' flood control and environmental restoration missions in Southern California.

$558,000 for the Orange Country Regional Water Reclamation Project – Also known as the Groundwater Replenishment System (GWRS), this project was a water supply initiative designed to reuse approximately 140,000 acre-feet of treated and recycled waste water every year.

$860,000 for the Westminster/East Garden Grove Watershed Study – Funding helped the Army Corps of Engineers continue its comprehensive study of the Westminster Watershed

$546,000 for the Surfside-Sunset and Newport Beaches – Funding helped mitigate damage along 17 miles of the Orange County coastline that was caused by the construction of federal navigation and flood control works in Long Beach and Anaheim Bay.

$369,000 for a Feasibility Study on the Aliso Creek Mainstem Project – Funding for the project helped to develop a plan to create stable flood plain areas and regenerate native riparian habitats, which resulted in cooler water and improved fish health.

== Political campaigns ==
=== 1994 ===
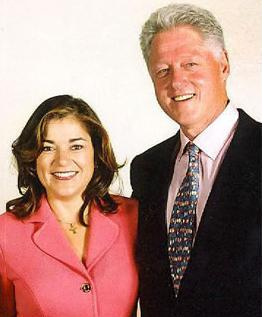
Loretta Sanchez with President Bill Clinton

Sanchez changed her party affiliation from Republican to Democratic in 1992, ahead of a 1994 campaign for Anaheim City Council. She ran under her married name Loretta Sanchez Brixey, but later dropped her married name because she believed that she and her seven brothers and sisters were better known in the community as the Sanchez family.

=== 1996 ===
In 1996, Sanchez ran for the US House in California's 46th District against six-term Republican incumbent Bob Dornan. The bitterly fought race saw Sanchez charge that Dornan was out of touch with his constituency, especially after a distracting run for the 1996 Republican presidential nomination. The 46th and its predecessors had always had a Democratic tilt, but became even more Democratic after the 1990 census when it absorbed a considerably larger number of Hispanics than had previously been in the district. Sanchez won by 984 votes, and Dornan contested the election, alleging that many votes were cast by people who were not American citizens. A 16-month Congressional investigation found some evidence that 624 votes were indeed cast illegally (of which 84 votes were cast by newly naturalized citizens on the actual date of the election who had registered before their naturalization, which is not allowed under California law). An additional 124 flawed absentee votes had already been thrown out by California officials.

In consultation with the INS, the House investigative panel began with an INS name-matching list of 4,329 individuals with entries in INS computer records, compared to the voter rolls in the 46th Congressional District; and proceeded to use other government records, including claims of non-citizenship to be excused from jury duty, ultimately arriving at a list of 7,841 "suspicious" votes. California's Secretary of State and the Orange County District Attorney also investigated a voter-registration group, Hermandad Mexicana Nacional and other alleged voter fraud in Orange County. Local investigators, and eventually the Los Angeles Times, confirmed that Hermandad, an immigration and naturalization service still very active today in both Texas and California, had helped 172 register to vote before their naturalization, under the erroneous belief by some of its employees that as long as someone was naturalized before the date of the election, this was lawful. The Orange County D.A. attempted to indict two employees of the organization, but when a grand jury declined to go along, the local investigation was dropped.

In February 1998 the House Committee on Oversight voted 8–1 to dismiss the matter, ending its investigation. As Federal law required a proportional reduction of vote totals for each candidate, there being no means of determining just which candidate an illegal (or suspected illegal) voter had actually voted for, it was clear the result of the disputed election would not change even if the probe had continued.

The acrimonious disputes between Republicans and Democrats throughout the investigation and a desire not to alienate voters of Hispanic/Latin descent in the forthcoming congressional elections by GOP leaders also seem to have played a role, along with former Rep. Dornan's rather abrasive personal style, which the House in general had grown tired of.

Indeed, the supposed total of 624 'illegal' votes was bitterly disputed by the Democratic minority, which argued that the investigation had never actually proved that many of the identified voters were in fact non-citizens; indeed asserting that between one quarter to even one half of "illegal" voters "were U.S. citizens at the time they voted in the 1996 election," although they registered to vote in advance of being sworn in as U.S. Citizens. And that in fact the Oversight Committee's suspected illegal voter list still "contain[ed] a significant number of names whose Orange County Voter Records indicate that they were born in the United States...." Despite the lengthy investigation, definitive proof of citizen or non-citizen status, and proof that the actual person still on the suspect voter list was actually the same individual whose name appeared in INS records was lacking for many of the 540 remaining voters, once those determined to have registered too early, before naturalization, were subtracted.

Sanchez became the first member of Congress of Mexican heritage to represent Orange County and was re-elected.

=== 1998–2008 ===
In a 1998 rematch, she easily defeated Dornan and would not face another serious contest in a congressional election. Her district was made even safer after the 2000 census, when it was renumbered as the 47th District and reconfigured as a Latino-majority district. During that redistricting process, Sanchez hired lobbyist Michael S. Berman, brother of California Democratic Congressman Howard Berman, for "redistricting consulting" on her behalf. She paid Berman $20,000 for his work.

In 2006, she defeated Tan D. Nguyen (R) with 62% of the vote.

=== 2003 gubernatorial recall election ===
During California's 2003 gubernatorial recall election, Sanchez was one of the first Democrats to break from Governor Gray Davis and state that a Democrat should run to succeed Davis in case the recall measure passed. Though she recommended that the Democratic candidate be California's senior Senator Dianne Feinstein, Sanchez stated that if no other serious Democratic contender stepped forward, she would be willing to run herself. Many California Democrats ultimately adopted Sanchez's position, paving the way for Lieutenant Governor Cruz Bustamante to enter the race.

=== 2008 ===
Sanchez won against Republican nominee Rosemarie Avila and American Independent Robert Lauten.

=== 2010 ===
Sanchez considered running for governor and for the United States Senate, but declined to enter the gubernatorial race after former governor Jerry Brown declared his candidacy and deferred to incumbent senator Barbara Boxer, who ran for re-election.

Sanchez was challenged by Republican nominee Van Tran and independent candidate Ceci Iglesias. According to Roll Call, Sanchez considered running for governor or for the U.S. Senate in 2010. In November 2005, she opened an exploratory committee called People for Loretta 2010. However, in June 2009, she announced she would run for reelection to the House.

In September 2010, Loretta Sanchez appeared on the Spanish language network, Univisión and said that "the Vietnamese and the Republicans are – with an intensity – trying to take away 'our' seat", referring to her Vietnamese-born opponent, Van Tran. Sanchez also described Tran as "anti-immigrant".

=== 2011 ===
In September, 2011 Sanchez's campaign treasurer, Kinde Durkee, was arrested on suspicion of mail fraud. Sanchez and several others of Durkee's clients found their campaign funds wiped out. Sanchez's then-chief of staff, Adrienne Elrod, remarked that "Kinde was someone whose services and counsel we trusted for many years. These charges if true are disheartening and a betrayal by a long time Democratic treasurer for many candidates and committees."

=== 2012 ===
After the 2010 census, Sanchez' district was renumbered as the 46th district. She was reelected handily, taking 63.9 percent of the vote.

=== 2016 ===
On May 16, 2015, when talking to a group of Indian Americans, Sanchez made a gesture mocking Native Americans by making a "war cry" that is stereotypically attributed to them. She described her confusion between Native Americans and Indian Americans prior to a meeting with an Indian-American, saying "I am going to his office, thinking that I am going to meet with a 'woo woo woo woo' (stereotypical Indian war cry) — Right? ... because he said Indian American." Many in the audience were shocked at the gesture, finding it offensive. After initially running away from a reporter who tried to question her about it, she apologized for it on May 17, saying "in this crazy and exciting rush of meetings yesterday, I said something offensive and for that, I sincerely apologize."

Due to Barbara Boxer's impending retirement, the 2016 Senate election in California had the first open seat Senate election in California in 24 years. On May 14, 2015, Loretta Sanchez announced her bid for this Senate seat. She competed against Attorney General of California Kamala Harris and thirty-two other candidates in California's top-two primary.

On June 7, 2016, Sanchez finished second in the primary, advancing to the general election with the first-place finisher, fellow Democrat Harris. She won six counties: Fresno, Imperial, Kings, Madera, Orange, and Tulare. All except Orange have a plurality Hispanic population. Sanchez's highest vote percentage in any of these counties was in Imperial: 35.4%.

On November 8, 2016, Sanchez lost the U.S. Senate race to Harris. Sanchez carried four counties: Fresno, Glenn, Imperial and Madera. She lost her home county, Orange, by seven points. In her concession speech, she stated that "Although we don't know what our future will be, I can tell you that this is not the last that people will see of me".

In January 2017, Sanchez donated her congressional papers to her alma mater, Chapman University in Orange, California. It encompasses twenty-five boxes of files, papers and committee work which will be available for public view at a later date. Sanchez has been a trustee and regular lecturer at the university.

=== 2019 ===
In December 2018, Sanchez announced that she was running for 3rd district Orange County supervisor, in a special election to fill a seat left vacant by Todd Spitzer after his election as the county's new district attorney. The election was held on March 12, 2019. Sanchez lost to Irvine mayor Donald P. Wagner but expressed interest in another run for the same seat in the next regular election, in 2020.

== Post-congressional career ==
In September 2017, it was announced that Sanchez would be the executive producer of a new political drama show called Accidental Candidate, which appeared on NBC. Since leaving the House, she has run unsuccessfully for two local offices in California, the Orange County Board of Supervisors and the Rancho Santiago Community College District as a college trustee.

== Electoral history ==
California's 47th congressional district election, 2008
Party	Candidate	Votes	%
Democratic	Loretta Sanchez (incumbent)	85,878	69.49
Republican	Rosemarie Avila	31,432	25.43
American Independent	Robert Lauten	6,274	5.08
Total votes		123,584	100.00
Turnout			57.01
Democratic hold			

California's 47th congressional district election, 2010
Party	Candidate	Votes	%
Democratic	Loretta Sanchez (incumbent)	50,832	53.0
Republican	Van Tran	37,679	39.3
Independent	Ceci Iglesias	7,443	7.7
Total votes		95,954	100.0
Democratic hold			

California's 46th congressional district election, 2012
Primary election
Party	Candidate	Votes	%
Democratic	Loretta Sanchez (incumbent)	25,706	52.1
Republican	Jerry Hayden	14,571	29.5
Republican	John J. Cullum	5,251	10.6
No party preference	Jorge Rocha	1,969	4.0
Republican	Pat Garcia	1,852	3.8
Total votes		49,349	100.0
General election
Democratic	Loretta Sanchez (incumbent)	95,694	63.9
Republican	Jerry Hayden	54,121	36.1
Total votes		149,815	100.0
Democratic hold			

California's 46th congressional district election, 2014
Primary election
Party	Candidate	Votes	%
Democratic	Loretta Sanchez (incumbent)	20,172	50.6
Republican	Adam Nick	7,234	18.1
Republican	John J. Cullum	5,666	14.2
Republican	Carlos Vazquez	4,969	12.5
Democratic	Ehab Atalla	1,835	4.6
Total votes		39,876	100.0
General election
Democratic	Loretta Sanchez (incumbent)	49,738	59.7
Republican	Adam Nick	33,577	40.3
Total votes		83,315	100.0
Democratic hold			

United States Senate election in California, 2016 primary
Party	Candidate	Votes	%
Democratic	Kamala Harris	3,000,689	37.9%
Democratic	Loretta Sanchez	1,416,203	17.9%
Republican	Duf Sundheim	584,251	7.8%
Republican	Phil Wyman	352,821	4.7%
Republican	Tom Del Beccaro	323,614	4.3%
Republican	Greg Conlon	230,944	3.1%
Democratic	Steve Stokes	168,805	2.2%
Republican	George C. Yang	112,055	1.5%
Republican	Karen Roseberry	110,557	1.5%
Libertarian	Gail K. Lightfoot	99,761	1.3%
Democratic	Massie Munroe	98,150	1.3%
Green	Pamela Elizondo	95,677	1.3%
Republican	Tom Palzer	93,263	1.2%
Republican	Ron Unz	92,325	1.2%
Republican	Don Krampe	69,635	0.9%
No party preference	Eleanor García	65,084	0.9%
Republican	Jarrell Williamson	64,120	0.9%
Republican	Von Hougo	63,609	0.8%
Democratic	President Cristina Grappo	63,330	0.8%
Republican	Jerry J. Laws	53,023	0.7%
Libertarian	Mark Matthew Herd	41,344	0.6%
Peace and Freedom	John Thompson Parker	35,998	0.5%
No party preference	Ling Ling Shi	35,196	0.5%
Democratic	Herbert G. Peters	32,638	0.4%
Democratic	Emory Peretz Rodgers	31,485	0.4%
No party preference	Mike Beitiks	31,450	0.4%
No party preference	Clive Grey	29,418	0.4%
No party preference	Jason Hanania	27,715	0.4%
No party preference	Paul Merritt	24,031	0.3%
No party preference	Jason Kraus	19,318	0.3%
No party preference	Don J. Grundmann	15,317	0.2%
No party preference	Scott A. Vineberg	11,843	0.2%
No party preference	Tim Gildersleeve	9,798	0.1%
No party preference	Gar Myers	8,726	0.1%
Republican	Billy Falling (write-in)	87	0.0%
No party preference	Ric M. Llewellyn (write-in)	32	0.0%
Republican	Alexis Stuart (write-in)	10	0.0%
Total votes		7,512,322	100%

2016 California United States Senate election results by county Harris—50–60% Harris—60–70% Harris—70–80% Sanchez—50–60% Sanchez—60–70%

2016 United States Senate election in California
Party	Candidate	Votes	%	±%
Democratic	Kamala Harris	7,542,753	61.60%	N/A
Democratic	Loretta Sanchez	4,701,417	38.40%	N/A
Total votes		12,244,170	100%	N/A
Democratic hold				

Orange County Board of Supervisors 3rd district special election, 2019
Party	Candidate	Votes	%
Republican	Donald P. Wagner	30,240	42.0
Democratic	Loretta Sanchez	26,708	37.1
Republican	Kristine "Kris" Murray	5,338	7.4
Republican	Larry Bales	3,912	5.4
Republican	Deborah Pauly	3,847	5.3
Republican	Kim-Thy "Katie" Hoang Bayliss	1,366	1.9
Republican	Katherine Daigle	597	0.8
Total votes		72,008	100.0
Republican hold			

Rancho Santiago Community College District Area 7, 2020
Candidate	Votes	%
Tina Arias Miller	18,893	54.5
Loretta Sanchez	15,865	45.5

== Personal life ==
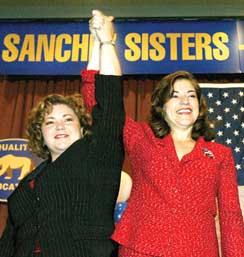
Loretta and her sister Linda Sánchez are the first pair of sisters to serve simultaneously in the United States Congress.

Sanchez was married for 14 years to stock broker Stephen Brixey before he filed for divorce on January 15, 2004.

In November 2010, Roll Call and the Orange County Register reported Loretta's engagement to retired Army Colonel Jack Einwechter. Einwechter is currently a lawyer practicing in Washington, D.C. The couple were married on July 16, 2011, in a private ceremony in Santa Ana, California.

Loretta's father, Ignacio ("Nacho"), suffered from Alzheimer's disease since 2001, eventually causing his death in 2018. She appears briefly in the HBO documentary film, The Alzheimer's Project: Caregivers.

=== In popular culture ===
The Hispanic Caucus Controversy (see above) was parodied on The Colbert Report on February 7, 2007.

Loretta Sanchez appeared as herself in the September 10, 2007 episode of The Closer entitled "Til Death Do Us Part, Part II". Within the fictional narrative of the show, she was briefly seen on the program Larry King Live being interviewed about a criminal legal case.

=== Holiday cards ===
While serving as a member of Congress, Sanchez was known for her annual tradition of sending constituents "wacky" "elaborately staged" holiday cards "featuring herself, her family members and her beloved pets." The cards have "cult status in the world of politics." She started in 1998 and continued the tradition through at least 2015. Over 500,000 cards were sent in 2014.

== See also ==
- List of Hispanic and Latino Americans in the United States Congress
- Final Report of the Task Force on Combating Terrorist and Foreign Fighter Travel
- Women in the United States House of Representatives

U.S. House of Representatives
Preceded by Bob Dornan	Member of the U.S. House of Representatives from California's 46th congressional district 1997–2003	Succeeded by Dana Rohrabacher
Preceded by Chris Cox	Member of the U.S. House of Representatives from California's 47th congressional district 2003–2013	Succeeded by Alan Lowenthal
Preceded by Dana Rohrabacher	Member of the U.S. House of Representatives from California's 46th congressional district 2013–2017	Succeeded by Lou Correa
U.S. order of precedence (ceremonial)
Preceded by Lynn Woolsey as Former U.S. Representative	Order of precedence of the United States as Former U.S. Representative	Succeeded by Susan Davis as Former U.S. Representative
