= Ken Maddox =

American politician

Kenneth W. Maddox

Member of the California State Assembly from the 68th district
- In office December 7, 1998 - November 30, 2004
- Preceded by: Curt Pringle
- Succeeded by: Van Tran

Personal details
- Born: February 29, 1964 (age 62) Long Beach, California, US
- Party: Republican
- Spouse(s): Crystal; Monica Lopez Maddox (m. 2009)
- Children: 2

Military service
- Branch/service: Army National Guard

Kenneth W. Maddox (born February 29, 1964, in Long Beach, California), also known as Ken Lopez-Maddox, is a former California State Assemblyman who served from 1998 until 2004, representing part of Orange County. After this term, he entered a State Senate primary, but was defeated by his opponent.

He received his Bachelor of Science degree from California Polytechnic State University, Pomona and is a member of the fraternity Sigma Phi Epsilon. He has his Master of Arts degree in management from the National University and was a past Senior Fellow of Public Policy at UCLA.

He was a deputy sheriff for Los Angeles County and a police officer in Tustin prior to his election to the assembly. He remained a reserve police officer during his tenure in the legislature. He has also been a volunteer firefighter, and served in the Army National Guard and Army Reserve from 1981 to 1989. He received a Reserve Commission in the United States Army while attending the University of Texas at Arlington and was branched Armor. He returned to serve in the military following the September 11 attacks.

Ken Lopez-Maddox is a member of the Lutheran Church Missouri Synod

== Assembly career ==
He was elected to the assembly in November 1998.

While in the legislature, Maddox served on a variety of policy committees including Public Safety, Insurance, Utilities and Commerce, Governmental Organization, Environmental Safety and Toxics, Agriculture, Education and Local Government. He served on the Select Committee on Elder Abuse and the Select Committee on Police Conduct, among others. He received the Order of California from Governor Gray Davis for his efforts on behalf of military veterans.

He authored California's Amber Alert legislation, Safe Surrender for Newborns and ocean water quality legislation to protect Huntington Beach's coastline and marine life.

He was also the Republican lead in an investigation into corruption at the Department of Insurance.

Prior to serving in the legislature, he served on the Garden Grove City Council. Maddox was on the City Council during major resort developments along the Harbor Corridor south of Disneyland. He was also involved in the construction of an education center and the recruitment of national restaurant chains to the area.

Maddox's term limit as a California State Assemblyman was reached in 2004.

== Post-Assembly career ==
=== 2006 Senate Race ===
He lost a State Senate primary in 2004 to John Campbell, an Assemblyman from a neighboring district. Maddox got 30% of the vote in the primary compared to Campbell's 61% of the vote. Maddox considered running for lieutenant governor in 2006 but ultimately did not.

=== Board of Equalization ===
Maddox became Senior Advisor on Legislation and Tax Policy for State Board of Equalization Member Michelle Steel in 2007.

=== School Board ===
In 2008, he was elected to a seat on the Board of Trustees of the Capistrano Unified School District after the incumbent was removed by the electorate in a recall election. The Capistrano Unified School District was the highest performing large school district in the state during his tenure on the Board. He served on the board of trustees for two years.

Emergency Service District

On June 1, 2021, he was appointed as a Commissioner of Emergency Service District 4 for Bexar County, Texas. This appointment was made by the Bexar County Commissioners Court.

== Succession Box ==
California Assembly
Preceded by Curt Pringle	California State Assemblyman, 68th District; December 7, 1998 - November 30, 2004	Succeeded by Van Tran
