= José I. Lozano =

American newspaper publisher (born 1954)

José Ignacio Lozano (born 1954) is the son of Ignacio E. Lozano, Jr. and Marta Navarro. He is the grandson of La Opinión newspaper founder Ignacio E. Lozano, Sr. He is the vice-chairman and executive vice-president of Impremedia LLC, the parent company that owns 50% of the newspaper founded by his grandfather.

== La Opinión career ==
In 1976, Lozano was appointed co-publisher of the family newspaper with his elder sister, Leticia Lozano. Leticia Lozano left the paper in 1984, and as a result of his father's retirement, José Lozano took over as the chief and sole publisher and CEO of La Opinión from 1986-2004., He was eventually succeeded as publisher by his younger sister, Monica C. Lozano.,

== Other activities ==
In 2008, he was appointed to the board of directors of Recreational Equipment, Inc. He is also on the Board of Trustees at Children's Hospital Los Angeles. He is on the Board of Directors for the Public Broadcasting Service, KCET (public broadcasting TV station for southern California), the Mexican American Legal Defense and Education Fund, the National Law Center for Inter-America Free Trade, and the Corporate Advisory Board of the Latin Business Association. He is on the board of councilors at the University of Southern California Annenberg School for Communication. He serves on the board of the Skadden Fellowship Foundation, which is sponsored by the law firm of Skadden, Arps, Slate, Meagher & Flom.

Lozano lives in Manhattan Beach, California.
