= Mimi Lozano =

American educator and Hispanic activist

- Born: 1933 (age 92–93); San Antonio, Texas
- Occupations: Educator and activist for Hispanic rights

Notes
- She was named the 2006 Woman of the Year by Costa Mesa, California Assemblyman Van Tran.

Mimi Lozano (born 1933) is an American educator and activist for Hispanic rights who co-founded the Society of Hispanic Historical and Ancestral Research and is the editor and publisher of Somos Primos, an online monthly publication dedicated to Hispanic heritage. She was named the 2006 Woman of the Year by Costa Mesa, California Assemblyman Van Tran.

== Early years ==
Lozano (birth name: Nohemi Lozano) was born in San Antonio, Texas to Catalino Lozano and Aurora Chapa. Her family moved to Los Angeles, California when she was an infant where she received her primary education. She moved from Los Angeles after her parents divorced and in 1951, Lozano and her sister graduated from Manteca High School in the San Joaquin Valley.

== Education ==
Lozano attended the University of California, Los Angeles (UCLA) and in 1955, earned her Bachelor of Science degree. That same year she married Win Holtzman whom she met while attending the UCLA graduate summer school. She continued her academic education in UCLA and earned her Master of Public and Recreation Administration in 1957. During her undergraduate studies at UCLA, she was involved in many youth related activities. As an interviewer of Los Angeles Playground Directors for the L.A. County Social Services, she began to see what little understanding existed among the playground directors of the Mexican culture.

In 1970, she earned her K-12 Teaching Credential from the University of California State, Dominguez College and in 1975 her Teaching Credentials from the California State Community College. Lozano was a Puppetry and Marionette teacher from 1975 to 1980 at Golden West College, Huntington Beach, California. where she completed 3 media related Golden West College grants. In 1975, she had an opportunity of using her position as instructor of Puppetry at Golden West College to help educate the community to the broader Hispanic culture. Using puppetry as the media, she produced/directed/mounted Hispanic folktales puppet plays. These were performed in the little theater at Golden West College to a children's audience. In 1981, she earned her State Certificate of Competence, in Spanish, also special ESL and Bilingual training.

== SHAAR ==
She became involved in promoting Hispanic heritage, locally and nationally and in 1986, Lozano, together with Tony Campos, Raul Guerra and Ophelia Marquez, co-founded the Society of Hispanic Historical and Ancestral Research (SHHAR) in Orange County, California. SHHAR is a non-profit, all-volunteer organization whose purpose is helping Hispanics and Latinos research their family history. The SHHAR booth at the Orange County Fair has won first place ribbons in Education and Quality and has taken ribbons at each of the four years, starting in 2000, in which SHHAR participated. Lozano currently serves as president of the organization which has grown to a national networking status.

== Somos Primos ==
In 1990, Lozano founded and has served as the editor and publisher of Somos Primos. Somos Primos, originally printed as a quarterly newsletter, is an online monthly publication dedicated to Hispanic heritage. Somos Primos came about out of the necessity for a SHHAR member newsletter. Somos Primos was first distributed to members, as a quarterly newsletter. In 1995, a database was developed for networking purposes for Somos Primos with the assistance of her husband Win Holtzman. This service in turn helped the increasing number of out of state and out of the country readers and researchers to communicate with each other. That same year, Lozano was named to the US Senate Task Force on Hispanic Affairs .

In 1995, she was involved with a Heritage Subcommittee which formed the nucleus of the Hispanic Heritage Committee of Orange County. The subcommittee's activity attempted to promote more awareness of Hispanic history and culture. In 1999, Board Lozano became a member of the Pepperdine University's Hispanic Council of Orange County. Lozano who was named to the US Senate Republican Conference Task Force on Hispanic Affair (1997–2003) has spoken as an invited guest by the U.S. Army at the Pentagon during the celebration of Hispanic Heritage Month.

== Honor ==
Lozano, was named California's 68th Assembly District's 2006 Woman of the Year by Assemblyman Van Tran. The annual Woman of the Year celebration at the State Capitol was founded by Assembly members Bev Hansen (R) and Sally Turner (D) in 1987 in honor of Women's History Month and is sponsored by the California Legislative Women's Caucus. Lozano is credited with pressing the Archives and other federal agencies to acknowledge publicly the significant contributions of Hispanics nationwide. She is quoted in Weekly Report as saying:

There are too many such stories long ignored, but there's still time to add them to the nation's historical record for future generations to integrate our historical contributions into the history and development of the U.S. We have been viewed as separate and apart, when in fact we provided a foundation. These events will reveal that truth of our continual presence and support

Lozano and her husband reside in California and have two children: a son Aury, a family physician, and a daughter Tawn, an attorney.

== See also ==
- List of Mexican Americans
