= Javier Lozano =

Javier Lozano may refer to:

- Javier Lozano Alarcón (born 1962), Mexican politician
- Javier Lozano Barragán (1933–2022), Mexican Roman Catholic cardinal
- Javier Lozano Chavira (born 1971), Mexican footballer
- Javier Lozano (futsal player) (born 1960), Spanish futsal player
