= Monica C. Lozano =

American newspaper editor

Monica Lozano
- Born: Monica Cecilia Lozano; July 21, 1956 (age 70); Los Angeles, California, U.S.
- Education: University of Oregon (BA)
- Spouse: Marcelo Centanino (divorced)
- Children: 2
- Relatives: Ignacio E. Lozano Jr. (father); José I. Lozano (brother); Ignacio E. Lozano Sr. (grandfather)

Monica Cecilia Lozano (born July 21, 1956) is the president of the College Futures Foundation, based in San Francisco. Previously she was an American newspaper editor, the publisher and CEO of La Opinión and CEO of its parent company, ImpreMedia, LLC. Based in Los Angeles, La Opinión is the largest Spanish publication in the United States. She was a member of President Obama's Economic Recovery Advisory Board. She was appointed by the California State Legislature to join Governor Arnold Schwarzenegger's Commission on the 21st Century Economy.

== Early life and education ==
Born in Los Angeles, Lozano was raised with her siblings in Newport Beach, California. Her father, Ignacio E. Lozano Jr., was a diplomat. Her paternal grandfather, Ignacio E. Lozano, Sr., a Mexican journalist, was born on the border of Mexico and Texas. In 1913, he founded La Prensa in San Antonio which became the largest Spanish daily publication in the United States. La Prensa sold copies in New York City, Chicago, and Los Angeles. In 1926, with much help from his wife, Lozano's grandfather founded La Opinión in Los Angeles, where La Prensa had had a particularly large following.

Although Lozano had studied literature for about three years at UCLA before marriage, she was a stay-at-home mother to Lozano and her siblings, while their father commuted to L.A. to work on the paper. In 1976, Ignacio E. Lozano, Jr. was appointed U.S. ambassador to El Salvador by President Gerald Ford.

Lozano first attended school in Corona del Mar, but graduated from Santa Catalina School in Monterey in 1974. She then studied sociology and political science at the University of Oregon. While there, she became interested in the new field of women's studies and worked for the Eugene, Oregon-based feminist newspaper Women's Press.

== Career ==
After graduating from college in 1976, Lozano traveled with a friend through Mexico and South America. She lived in San Francisco, where she earned a degree in printing technology at the City College. She also worked on a couple of bilingual newspapers. Then in November 1985, she went to work with her family as managing editor of La Opinión. Early in the following year, her brother, José I. Lozano, the paper's publisher at that time, sent her to the Poynter Institute for a two-week intensive training course in media management.

Lozano has been on the board of directors at the Walt Disney Company since 2000. She was named an independent director of Bank of America in April 2006. She is on the board of Southern California's Weingart Foundation and the National Council of La Raza. She is a member of the Board of Regents for the University of California and the Board of Trustees at the University of Southern California. Since 2001, she has been on the board at UnionBanCal Corporation. In 2012, Lozano was named to the board of the Rockefeller Foundation. From 2002-2005, she was a director of the Tenet Healthcare Corporation. Since 2014, Lozano has sat on the Board of The Cisneros Center for New Americans. In March 2016, she was appointed to Target’s board of directors. She is also a member of the Inter-American Dialogue. In January 2021, she was appointed to the board of directors of Apple Inc.

== Personal life ==
Lozano married Marcelo Centanino in 1986. The couple had two children before divorcing.

Lozano began to work at La Opinión at a time when AIDS was still a taboo issue, especially among the predominantly Catholic Latino communities. She fought hard against prejudice and fear to address the disease. She was also alarmed by the high rates of infant mortality among Hispanic women and she worked on stories covering prenatal care. Lozano also oversaw an increase of what she called "proactive" political journalism. California Governor Pete Wilson and Senator Barbara Boxer were interviewed on its pages.

She became the publisher of El Eco del Valle (in the San Fernando Valley) in 1990. Her husband, previously working in the circulation department of La Opinión, went to organize the distribution of El Eco del Valle. Around the same time, Lozano was promoted to Associate Publisher, under her brother, at La Opinión.

== Awards ==
- NHMC Impact Awards (2021) (NHMC Impact Award Outstanding Leadership)
