= 2010 California State Board of Equalization election =

2010 California State Board of Equalization elections
- November 2, 2010

All 4 seats on the California State Board of Equalization
	Majority party	Minority party	Third party
Party	Democratic	Republican	Libertarian
Last election	2	2	0
Seats before	2	2	0
Seats won	2	2	0
Seat change	Steady	Steady	Steady
Popular vote	4,697,176	3,314,369	507,112
Percentage	51.8%	36.5%	5.6%

The 2010 California State Board of Equalization elections took place on November 2, 2010, to elect all four seats of the State Board of Equalization, with the primary election taking place on June 8, 2010.

== Overview ==
California State Board of Equalization general election, 2010
Party	Candidates	Votes		Seats			
Party	Candidates	No.	%	Before	After	+/–	%
Democratic Party	4	4,697,176	51.8%	2	2	Steady	50.0%
Republican Party	3	3,314,369	36.5%	2	2	Steady	50.0%
Libertarian Party	4	507,112	5.6%	0	0	Steady	0.0%
Peace and Freedom Party	4	277,872	3.1%	0	0	Steady	0.0%
American Independent Party	2	275,152	3.0%	0	0	Steady	0.0%
Total	17	9,071,681	100.0%	4	4	Steady	100.0%

Popular vote
Democratic	51.8%
Republican	36.5%
Libertarian	5.6%
Peace and Freedom	3.1%
American Independent	3.0%

Board of Equalization seats
Democratic	50.0%
Republican	50.0%

Board of Equalization District	Incumbent	Party	Elected officeholder	Party
1st	Betty Yee	Democratic	Betty Yee	Democratic
2nd	Barbara Alby	Republican	George Runner	Republican
3rd	Michelle Steel	Republican	Michelle Steel	Republican
4th	Jerome Horton	Democratic	Jerome Horton	Democratic

== District 1 ==
The incumbent was Democrat Betty Yee, who was appointed to finish the term of Carole Migden and was elected in 2006 with 65.0% of the vote. She was running for reelection.

=== Primary election ===
==== Results ====
2010 California State Board of Equalization District 1 Democratic primary
Party	Candidate	Votes	%
Democratic	Betty Yee (incumbent)	564,903	74.7
Democratic	Ted Ford	149,166	19.7
Democratic	G. Alan Montgomery	43,075	5.6
Total votes		757,144	100.0

2010 California State Board of Equalization District 1 Republican primary
Party	Candidate	Votes	%
Republican	Kevin R. Scott	272,593	68.9
Republican	Rae Williams	123,258	31.1
Total votes		395,851	100.0

2010 California State Board of Equalization District 1 Libertarian primary
Party	Candidate	Votes	%
Libertarian	Kennita Watson	5,654	100.0
Total votes		5,654	100.0

2010 California State Board of Equalization District 1 Peace and Freedom primary
Party	Candidate	Votes	%
Peace and Freedom	Sherill Borg	1,501	100.0
Total votes		1,501	100.0

=== General election ===
==== Candidates ====
- Sherill Borg (P&F), community development officer
- Kevin R. Scott (R), small business owner
- Kennita Watson (L), retired engineer
- Betty Yee (D), incumbent member of the Board of Equalization

==== Results ====
California's 1st Board of Equalization district, 2010
Party	Candidate	Votes	%
Democratic	Betty Yee (incumbent)	1,617,369	63.1
Republican	Kevin R. Scott	799,327	31.2
Libertarian	Kennita Watson	77,929	3.0
Peace and Freedom	Sherill Borg	71,183	2.7
Total votes		2,565,808	100.0
Democratic hold			

== District 2 ==
The incumbent was Republican Barbara Alby, who was appointed to finish the term of Bill Leonard, who resigned early to serve in Arnold Schwarzenegger's administration. Alby lost in the Republican primary.

=== Primary election ===
==== Results ====
2010 California State Board of Equalization District 2 Democratic primary
Party	Candidate	Votes	%
Democratic	Chris Parker	220,120	49.4
Democratic	Paul Vincent Avila	138,441	31.0
Democratic	Mark L. Stebbins	87,514	19.6
Total votes		446,075	100.0

2010 California State Board of Equalization District 2 Republican primary
Party	Candidate	Votes	%
Republican	George Runner	233,625	35.3
Republican	Alan Nakanishi	197,516	29.9
Republican	Barbara Alby (incumbent)	168,363	25.4
Republican	Edward C. Streichman	62,337	9.4
Total votes		661,791	100.0

2010 California State Board of Equalization District 2 Libertarian primary
Party	Candidate	Votes	%
Libertarian	Willard D. Michlin	4,739	100.0
Total votes		4,739	100.0

2010 California State Board of Equalization District 2 Peace and Freedom primary
Party	Candidate	Votes	%
Peace and Freedom	Toby Mitchell-Sawyer	901	100.0
Total votes		901	100.0

=== General election ===
==== Candidates ====
- Willard D. Michlin (L), CPA/businessman
- Toby Mitchell-Sawyer (P&F), security officer
- Chris Parker (D), tax professional/educator
- George Runner (R), member of the California State Senate (2004-2010)

==== Results ====
California's 2nd Board of Equalization district, 2010
Party	Candidate	Votes	%
Republican	George Runner	1,189,504	50.0
Democratic	Chris Parker	1,019,844	42.9
Libertarian	Willard D. Michlin	112,825	4.7
Peace and Freedom	Toby Mitchell-Sawyer	58,242	2.4
Total votes		2,380,415	100.0
Republican hold			

== District 3 ==
The incumbent was Republican Michelle Steel, who was elected in 2006 with 57.0% of the vote. She was running for reelection.

=== Primary election ===
==== Results ====
2010 California State Board of Equalization District 3 Democratic primary
Party	Candidate	Votes	%
Democratic	Mary Christian Heising	372,228	100.0
Total votes		372,228	100.0

2010 California State Board of Equalization District 3 Republican primary
Party	Candidate	Votes	%
Republican	Michelle Steel (incumbent)	457,466	68.9
Republican	Vic Baker	206,994	31.1
Total votes		664,460	100.0

2010 California State Board of Equalization District 3 American Independent primary
Party	Candidate	Votes	%
American Independent	Terri Lussenheide	11,871	100.0
Total votes		11,871	100.0

2010 California State Board of Equalization District 3 Libertarian primary
Party	Candidate	Votes	%
Libertarian	Jerry L. Dixon	5,463	100.0
Total votes		5,463	100.0

2010 California State Board of Equalization District 3 Peace and Freedom primary
Party	Candidate	Votes	%
Peace and Freedom	Mary Lou Finley	792	100.0
Total votes		792	100.0

=== General election ===
==== Candidates ====
- Jerry L. Dixon (L), CPA
- Mary Lou Finley (P&F), teacher
- Mary Christian Heising (D), retired businesswoman
- Terri Lussenheide (AI), teacher
- Michelle Steel (R), incumbent member of the Board of Equalization

==== Results ====
California's 3rd Board of Equalization district, 2010
Party	Candidate	Votes	%
Republican	Michelle Steel (incumbent)	1,325,538	54.9
Democratic	Mary Christian Heising	836,057	34.6
Libertarian	Jerry L. Dixon	117,783	4.8
Peace and Freedom	Mary Lou Finley	79,870	3.3
American Independent	Terri Lussenheide	59,513	2.4
Total votes		2,418,761	100.0
Republican hold			

== District 4 ==
The incumbent was Democrat Jerome Horton, who was appointed to finish the term of Judy Chu, who resigned early after the special election to the U.S. House of Representatives. Horton was running for a full term.

=== Primary election ===
==== Results ====
2010 California State Board of Equalization District 4 Democratic primary
Party	Candidate	Votes	%
Democratic	Jerome Horton (incumbent)	257,542	100.0
Total votes		257,542	100.0

2010 California State Board of Equalization District 4 American Independent primary
Party	Candidate	Votes	%
American Independent	Shawn Hoffman	4,166	100.0
Total votes		4,166	100.0

2010 California State Board of Equalization District 4 Libertarian primary
Party	Candidate	Votes	%
Libertarian	Peter "Pedro" De Baets	2,202	100.0
Total votes		2,202	100.0

2010 California State Board of Equalization District 4 Peace and Freedom primary
Party	Candidate	Votes	%
Peace and Freedom	Nancy Lawrence	665	100.0
Total votes		665	100.0

=== General election ===
==== Candidates ====
- Peter "Pedro" De Baets (L), small business owner
- Shawn Hoffman (AI), business administrator
- Jerome Horton (D), incumbent member of the Board of Equalization
- Nancy Lawrence (P&F), jewelrymaker

==== Results ====
California's 4th Board of Equalization district, 2010
Party	Candidate	Votes	%
Democratic	Jerome Horton (incumbent)	1,223,906	71.8
American Independent	Shawn Hoffman	215,639	12.6
Libertarian	Peter "Pedro" De Baets	198,575	11.6
Peace and Freedom	Nancy Lawrence	68,577	4.0
Total votes		1,706,697	100.0
Democratic hold			
