= Manuel Lozano =

Manuel Lozano may refer to:

- Manuel Lozano (actor), actor in the 1999 film Butterfly's Tongue
- Manuel Lozano Garrido (1920–1971), Spanish journalist
- Manuel Rodríguez Lozano (1896–1971), Mexican painter
