= Juan Manuel Lozano Mejía =

Mexican physicist (1929–2007)

- Born: 12 December 1929; Mexico City
- Died: 10 October 2007 (aged 77); Mexico City
- Education: UNAM
- Known for: Nuclear Physics
- Scientific career
- Fields: Physics
- Workplaces: UNAM
- Thesis: Descripción causal y relaciones de dispersión (1960)
- Doctoral advisor: Marcos Moshinsky

Juan Manuel Lozano Mejía (Mexico City, 12 December 1929 – Mexico City, 10 October 2007) was a recognized Mexican physicist. He was one of the pioneers of nuclear physics in Mexico and an academic at Universidad Nacional Autónoma de México for over fifty years.

== Biography ==
He carried out his bachelor's and doctoral studies in Physics at the School of Sciences, UNAM from 1947 to 1952, at its original campus (Palacio de Minería). His theses were the following: Dynamical description of a potential dispersion (1953) and Causal description and dispersion relations (1960) [translated from spanish: Descripción dinámica de la dispersión por un potencial and Descripción causal y relaciones de dispersión], both were directed by Professor Marcos Moshinsky.

His academic and professional career began as a professor at the School of Sciences and as a researcher at the Physics Institute at UNAM after the university's main campus changed to Ciudad Universitaria. He was the director of the School of Sciences, UNAM, from 1969 to 1973. He also worked for some time at the Observatorio Astronómico Nacional (Spanish for National Astronomy Observatory) at UNAM and the Instituto Nacional de Investigación Científica (Spanish for National Institute of Scientific Research), the latter of which would then become the Consejo Nacional de Humanidades, Ciencias y Tecnologías (Spanish for National Council of Humanities Science and Technology).

His knowledge of the educational, scientific, and cultural environment would lead him to participate in the creation and operation of several national institutions, such as the Colegio de Ciencias y Humanidades (Spanish for School of Science and Humanities), Colegio de Bachilleres (Mexican public high school system), and the Universidad Autónoma Metropolitana (Spanish for Metropolitan Autonomous University).

He was also a founder of the Mexican Physical Society (1950) and the precursor organization for the current Mexican Academy of Sciences (1959). He was invited and incorporated into a number of commissions and councils for university institutions. When he died in October of 2007, he was a member of the Comisión Especial del Consejo Universitario (CECU, Spanish for Special University Council Commission) for the Congreso Universitario (Spanish for University Congress).

== Honors and commemorations ==
Juan Manuel Lozano Mejía belongs to the generation of academics that UNAM recognizes as "forgers of science" due to his personal and institutional contributions.

Since 2004, a "Juan Manuel Lozano Mejía" medal and diploma is granted to outstanding physics students associated to UNAM's Physics Institute.
