= ImpreMedia =

ImpreMedia, LLC
- Headquarters: 15 MetroTech Center, Downtown Brooklyn, New York City, USA
- Parent: My Code Media (2022-present)
- Website: www.impremedia.com

ImpreMedia, LLC is a media company headquartered in Downtown Brooklyn, New York City, and founded in 2004.

ImpreMedia's properties include Hispanic newspapers, websites, and magazines. It has some of the most reputed American Spanish language news publications in its portfolio, such as La Opinión and El Diario La Prensa.

In 2012, ImpreMedia, LLC, was taken over by US Hispanic Media Inc, a subsidiary of Argentinian company S.A. La Nación.

In May 2022, four years after Iván Adaime was appointed CEO of ImpreMedia, it was announced that My Code Media acquired majority ownership of the company.

== Print ==
- La Opinión in Los Angeles
- El Diario La Prensa in New York
- La Raza in Chicago
- La Prensa in Orlando
- La Opinión de la Bahía in San Francisco

== Digital media ==
- La Opinión
- El Diario
- La Raza
- Solo Dinero
- Siempre Auto
- Comedera
- Estar Mejor
- Guía de Compras
