= Raúl García (footballer, born 1980) =

Spanish footballer

Personal information
- Full name: Raúl García Lozano
- Date of birth: 11 September 1980 (age 46)
- Place of birth: Oviedo, Spain
- Height: 1.87 m (6 ft 1 1/2 in)
- Position: Centre-back

Youth career
- 1990–1999: Oviedo

Senior career*
Years	Team	Apps	(Gls)
1999–2002	Oviedo B	52	(4)
2000–2003	Oviedo	38	(3)
2003	Racing Ferrol	4	(1)
2004	Toledo	12	(0)
2004–2007	Lanzarote	80	(2)
2007–2008	Logroñés	29	(3)
2008	Lanzarote	16	(1)
2009	Ciudad Santiago	16	(0)
2009–2010	Mirandés	32	(1)
2010–2012	Montañeros	51	(2)
2012–2013	Cudillero	14	(0)
2013	Marino	14	(1)
2013–2014	Austria Klagenfurt	14	(1)
Total		372	(19)
- * Club domestic league appearances and goals

Raúl García Lozano (born 11 September 1980 in Oviedo, Asturias) is a Spanish former professional footballer who played as a central defender.
