= Van Tran =

American politician

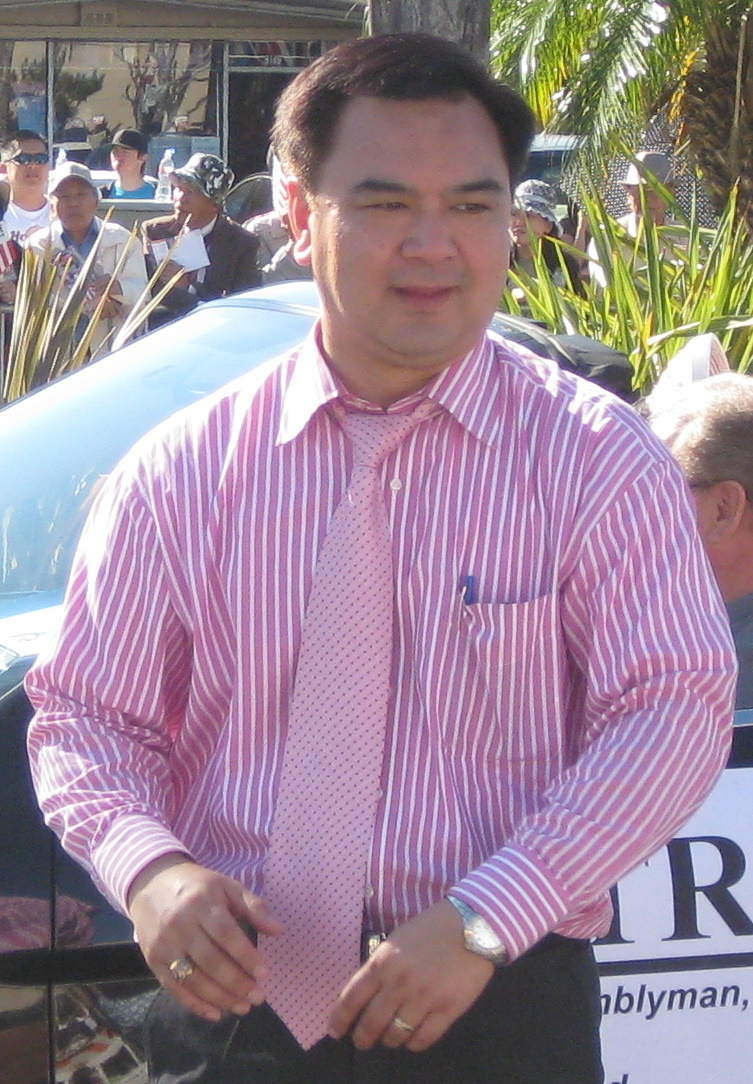

Orange County Water District Board of Directors, Division 2
- Incumbent
- Assumed office September 26, 2024

Member of the California State Assembly from the 68th district
- In office December 6, 2004 – November 30, 2010
- Preceded by: Ken Maddox
- Succeeded by: Allan Mansoor

Personal details
- Born: October 19, 1964 (age 61) Saigon, South Vietnam
- Party: Republican
- Spouse: Cyndi Nguyen (m. 2004)
- Children: 3

Van Thai Tran (Vietnamese: Trần Thái Văn; born October 19, 1964) is a Vietnamese American attorney and politician in California, formerly serving as a Republican member of the California State Assembly, representing portions of Orange County. Tran was the highest-ranking Vietnamese American elected official was the highest-ranking Vietnamese American elected official in U.S. history along with Hubert Vo until Joseph Cao was elected to the United States House of Representatives in 2008. Tran took office one month before Vo did, making him the first Vietnamese American to serve in a state legislature. He served in the Assembly as Assistant Republican Leader.

== Early life, education and career ==
On October 19, 1964, Tran was born in Saigon, South Vietnam. Tran and his family emigrated to the United States after being evacuated by the United States Army one week before the Fall of Saigon, when he was 10 years old. After originally settling in Grand Rapids, Michigan, they moved to Orange County when Tran was in high school.

Tran worked as an intern and later as a staff aide for Congressman Bob Dornan and for State Senator Ed Royce. He earned a B.A. in Political Science at the University of California, Irvine. Tran completed a Master of Public Administration from Hamline University and a J.D. from Hamline University School of Law. He was admitted to the California State Bar in 1994.

In 2000, Tran was elected to the Garden Grove City Council with the highest number of votes in city history and became only the second Vietnamese American man to be elected to office in the United States (Tony Lam was the first when he was elected to the city council of neighboring Westminster in 1992).

== California State Assembly ==
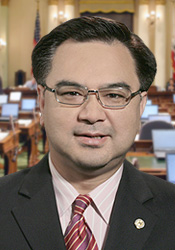
Tran's California State Assembly portrait

=== Elections ===
==== 2004 ====
In 2004, after incumbent Ken Maddox became term-limited, Tran ran against Mark Leyes for his seat, the 68th assembly district. On November 2, 2004, Tran was elected to the California Assembly.

==== 2006 ====
Tran was re-elected to the Assembly in 2006. On November 7, 2006, Tran won re-election with 62% of the vote.

==== 2008 ====
Tran also ran for re-election in 2008, winning the general election with 54% of the vote. Tran was re-elected to the Assembly in 2008.

=== Tenure ===
Tran represented the 68th District. He was the Vice Chair of the Assembly Judiciary Committee. He also served on the Banking and Finance Committee and the Governmental Organization Committee. In June 2007, he was appointed by the Assembly Speaker as chairman of the Select Committee on International Trade.

== Post-Assembly activities ==
=== 2010 congressional election ===
On April 28, 2009, Politico reported that prominent Republicans such as John McCain encouraged Tran, who was term-limited from the state Assembly, to run for California's 47th congressional district. Ultimately, after running in the primary for the Republican nomination, Tran faced off against the seven-term Democratic incumbent Loretta Sanchez in the general election. The race attracted mainstream attention, with Rudy Giuliani and Bill Clinton stumping for Tran and Sanchez, respectively. Some Vietnamese were angered by Sanchez's comment that "the Vietnamese and the Republicans" sought to win her seat. Tran ultimately lost, only winning 39.3% of the vote compared to Sanchez's 53.0%.

=== 2014 State Board of Equalization election ===
In 2013, Tran announced that he would run for State Board of Equalization representing District 4. He came in fourth place in the primary election, losing to Assemblywoman Diane Harkey and Nader Shahatit who advanced to the general election.

=== 2024 Orange County Board of Supervisors election ===
In August 2022, Tran was appointed Chief of Staff for Orange County Supervisor Andrew Do who represented District 1.

With Do being termed out of office, Tran ran in 2024 for Do's seat with Do's endorsement. Tran ended up in third place behind Cypress City Councilmember Frances Marquez and state Senator Janet Nguyen in the primary for the first district; the top two candidates competed in a runoff election later in November.

=== Orange County Water District ===
In December 2022, Tran was appointed to the Orange County Water District Board of Directors to represent Division 4 after the seat had been vacated by Tri Ta. Later that month, the board voted him as the second vice president. In 2024 Tran filed to run for another term, as the appointed incumbent. The election was cancelled due to a lack of qualified opponents, and he was therefore appointed for another term.

== Personal life ==
In 2004, he married his wife, Cyndi Nguyen. As of 2022, Tran has three children and resides in Westminster. Tran is a Catholic.

== Electoral history ==
2024 Orange County Board of Supervisors primary election, First District
Candidate	Votes	%
Janet Nguyen	59,702	43.5
Frances Marquez	35,687	26.0
Van Tran	24,717	18.0
Kimberly Ho	8,683	6.3
Michael Vo	8,599	6.3

2014 California State Board of Equalization District 4 primary election
Primary election
Party	Candidate	Votes	%
Republican	Diane Harkey	324,642	34.8
Democratic	Nader Shahatit	316,666	33.9
Republican	John F. Kelly	101,836	10.9
Republican	Van Tran	84,162	9.0
Republican	Shirley Horton	74,794	8.0
Republican	Lewis Da Silva	32,094	3.4
Total votes		934,194	100.0

2010 California's 47th congressional district general election
Party	Candidate	Votes	%
Democratic	Loretta Sanchez (incumbent)	50,832	53.0
Republican	Van Tran	37,679	39.3
Independent	Ceci Iglesias	7,443	7.7
Total votes		95,954	100.0

2010 California's 47th congressional district Republican primary election
Party	Candidate	Votes	%
Republican	Van Tran	10,706	54.7
Republican	Katherine H. Smith	5,017	25.6
Republican	Tan Nguyen	3,876	19.7
Total votes		95,954	100.0

California Assembly
Preceded by Ken Maddox	California State Assemblyman; 68th district December 6, 2004 - November 30, 2010	Succeeded by Allan Mansoor
