= Alejandro Lozano (artist) =

Spanish painter

Alejandro Lozano Morales (March 17, 1939 – March 30, 2003) was a Spanish artist, painter and mosaic muralist.

== Life ==
Alejandro Lozano was born in La Toba, Guadalajara, Spain. He studied humanities at the El Pardo Seminary in Madrid from 1951 to 1957. On 13 March 1965 he was ordinated as a priest. From 1965 to 1969, he studied at the Conservatori Municipal d’Arts Massana (Applied Arts School) in Barcelona, where he obtained a graduate qualification in Applied Arts, specializing in painting, mural techniques and refurbishment processes. As a Capuchin brother, he lived at the Pompeia cloister in Barcelona.

During July and August 1966, he attended the courses ‘Corsi estivi di Pintura' at the Scola di Bella Arti "Pietro Vannucci" in Perugia (Italy). That same year, he enrolled at the Fine Arts University of Barcelona (Escola Superior de Belles Arts Sant Jordi).

In 1968, he attended the ‘Corso de alta cultura’ at the ‘Università Italiana per Stranieri’ in Perugia (Italy), and exhibited his work in the ‘Mostra in Centro Internazionale’ (Crocevia).

Between 1970 and 1972, he completed "Good News", a mosaic mural (10x2 m) created for the altarpiece of the church at Ciutat Residencial de E. i D. in Marbella (Málaga, Spain). The curved surface of the mural adapts to the wall in an embracing gesture.

From 1972 through 1974, he created the large-format work "Calvary" (9x5 m). It is a mosaic installed at the main altar in the Cathedral of Tucupita (Delta Amacuro, Venezuela). During the same period, he also produced the mosaics "Saint Francis and Brother Sun" (15 m^{2}), for the right nave of this cathedral, and "Divina Pastora" (15 m^{2}), for the link nave.

During the period 1973-1974, he completed the Drawing Teaching courses at the Fine Arts University (Escola Superior de Belles Arts) in Barcelona. He obtained the Drawing Teacher Certificate, which allowed him to expand his teaching activity which he had begun years earlier.

From 1975 through 1978, he created the murals "Annuntiation", "Catequesis", "Baptism in the mission", "Christ and the Samaritan" (3x2 m^{2}) and "Christ’s Baptism " for Tucupita’s Cathedral façade. "Santa Cecilia", "Saint Francis guided by an angel", "Saint Pius X" and "Saint Toribio de Mogrovejo" are round mosaic murals for the choir and central nave of the cathedral.

In May 1975, Lozano received a papal dispensation and married Francisca Tormo in Esparreguera (Catalonia, Spain).

From November to October 1978, he undertook his second trip to Venezuela and continued the ensemble of the façade, choir and central nave murals of Tucupita’s Cathedral.

In July 1981, he graduated from the University of Barcelona with a degree in Fine Arts.

On 26 September 1982, Tucupita's Cathedral was inaugurated at an event attended by several bishops and the President of the Venezuelan Republic.

Later in his life, Lozano continued his artistic mural and painting work, working as a painting and drawing teacher in Barcelona. He died in Barcelona on March 30, 2003, aged 63.

== Works ==
- 1972-1982 Altarpieces for the interior and façade of Tucupita’s Cathedral, (Delta Amacuro, Venezuela).
- 1974. "Arribada de Colom davant els reis Catòlics" (Arrival of Christopher Columbus before the Catholic Monarchs). Mosaic mural.
- 1975. Mural "Colón en la puerta de la Paz" (Columbus at the Door of Peace).
- 1984. "Y al fondo la Catedral" (The Cathedral in the background), oil on canvas from the "Barcelona Monumental" series. "Champán y tres naranjas", mosaic from Greece.
- 1985. "Y al fondo, monumento a Colón" (Columbus monument in the background), mosaic from "Barcelona Monumental" series.
- 1987. Mosaic altarpiece (5,25x4,25m2) for Bellamar’s Church devoted to Saint Eulalia of Barcelona (Castelldefels, Barcelona, Spain).
- 1988-89. "San Juan Bosco y Maria Auxiliadora", mosaic mural for the facade of the Salesian church façade (Huesca, Spain).
- 1991. "Los cuatro evangelistas" (The four evangelists), four circular murals (1m diameter) for the main church in Tivenys (Tarragona, Spain).

== Exhibitions ==
- 1965 December. Collective exhibition at the gallery ‘Sala d’Art Canuda’ (Barcelona, Spain).
- 1968 "Mostra in Centro Internazionale" (Crocevia, Italy).
- 1974. Galeria Prócer (Barcelona). Exhibition of the ensemble of three altarpieces for Tucupita’s Cathedral "The Calvary", "Saint Francis and Brother Sun" and "Divina Pastora".
- 1983. Mosaic exhibition at the gallery ‘Sala Turó de la Peira’ (Barcelona, Spain).
- 1990, November. Oil paintings and mosaics exhibition at the ‘Sala Pau Claris’, Barcelona.
- 2000, Oil paintings and mosaics exhibition at the ‘Sala Fort Pienc’, Barcelona.
