= Javier Lozano (futsal player) =

Spanish futsal player and manager

Personal information
- Full name: Javier Lozano Cid
- Date of birth: 28 October 1960 (age 66)
- Place of birth: Toledo, Spain

Senior career*
| Years | Team | Apps | (Gls) |
- Discolandia
- Toledo
- Algón
- Marsanz
- Caja Toledo

Managerial career
- Caja Toledo
- Interviú
- 1992–2007: Spain
- * Club domestic league appearances and goals

Javier Lozano Cid (born 28 October 1960) is a Spanish former futsal player and World Cup champion two times as a manager. He is currently the president of the LNFS.

== Career ==
He has managed the Spain national futsal team.

== Coaching achievements ==
- Five tournaments "Four Nations" (1993, 1994,1995, 1997 and 1998)
- Third place - World Futsal Championship - Hong Kong 1992
- UEFA European Tournament Winner - Cordoba, Spain 1996
- Second place - World Futsal Championship - Spain 1996
- Tiger's FIFA Tournament Winner - Singapore 1997
- World Futsal Championship Winner - Guatemala 2000
- European Championship Winner - Moscow, Russia 2001
- Tiger's FIFA Tournament Winner - Singapore 2001
- Third place - European Championship - Caserta, Italy 2003
- World Futsal Championship Winner - Chinese Taipei 2004
- European Championship Winner - Ostrava, Czech Republic 2005
