= Ignacio E. Lozano Jr. =

American diplomat (1927–2023)

Ignacio Eugenio Lozano Jr. (January 15, 1927 – December 27, 2023) was an American diplomat who was United States Ambassador to El Salvador. He was appointed to the ambassadorship by President Gerald Ford in 1976. He resigned the post following the assumption of the presidency by Jimmy Carter. Lozano was born in San Antonio, Texas to Mexican immigrants Ignacio E. Lozano Sr. and Alicia Elizondo Lozano. He studied journalism at University of Notre Dame.

From 1953, he was the publisher and editor of La Opinión, a Spanish language newspaper based in Los Angeles that his father founded in 1926. In 1964, President Lyndon B. Johnson appointed Lozano as a consultant to the United States Department of State. He also served on the California advisory committee to the United States Commission on Civil Rights.

Lozano held directorships at Bank of America, The Walt Disney Company, Pacific Life, and Sempra Energy, and was a member of the Council of American Ambassadors.

== Personal life ==
Ignacio Eugenio Lozano Jr. was born on January 15, 1927. He married Arizona-born Marta, who was studying literature at UCLA and was also Mexican American. They had four children:

- Leticia Lozano (worked for La Opinión from 1976–1984)
- José Ignacio Lozano (became publisher of La Opinión in 1986; since 2004 vice chairman of its parent companion, Impremedia LLC),
- Monica C. Lozano (current publisher of La Opinión)
- Francisco Lozano (corporate director of magazines, Impremedia LLC)

Ignacio E. Lozano Jr. died on December 27, 2023, at the age of 96.
