= La Opinión =

Spanish-language newspaper published in Los Angeles

- Type: Daily newspaper
- Format: Tabloid
- Owner: ImpreMedia
- Founded: September 16, 1926
- Language: Spanish
- Headquarters: 915 Wilshire Boulevard; Suite 915; Los Angeles, California 90017
- Circulation: 116,256 Daily; 53,325 Saturday; 38,167 Sunday
- ISSN: 0276-590X
- Website: laopinion.com

La Opinión is a Spanish-language daily newspaper and website based in Los Angeles, California. It is the largest Spanish-language newspaper in the United States and the second-most read newspaper in Los Angeles (after The Los Angeles Times). It is published by ImpreMedia, LLC.

== History ==
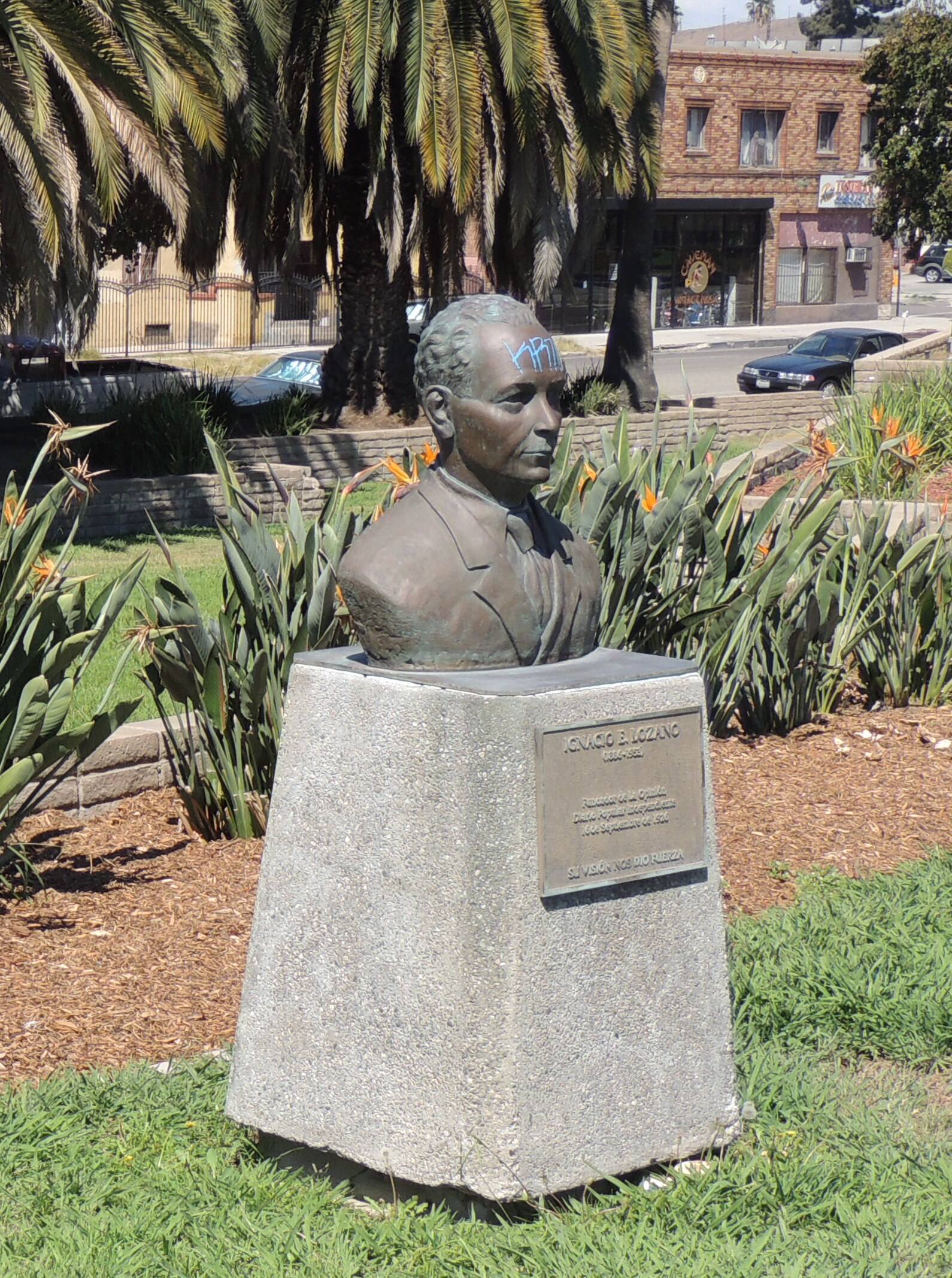
Bust of Ignacio E. Lozano Sr., founder of La Opinión, in Los Angeles, California.

The paper was first founded and published on September 16, 1926, by Ignacio E. Lozano Sr. He emigrated from Mexico to San Antonio, Texas, in 1908, where Lozano first founded a Spanish-language daily newspaper known as La Prensa in 1913.

With the increase in the Mexican population Los Angeles experienced during the 1920s, Lozano believed he had a strong base for a Spanish newspaper in the growing city and founded La Opinión on September 16 to coincide with Mexico's Independence Day. The Lozano family retained control over both La Prensa and La Opinión until 1959 when La Prensa was sold.

In its early existence La Opinión consisted primarily of news from Mexico to accommodate the reading preferences of its audience, made up in large part by recently emigrated Mexicans. La Opinión was one of the few newspapers to provide comprehensive coverage of the deportations and repatriations of Mexicans during the 1930s as well as the Zoot Suit Riots of the 1940s.

In 1990, 50% ownership of the paper was sold to the Times Mirror Company, which merged with the Tribune Company in 2000. In 2004, ImpreMedia bought Tribune Company out and regained full control over La Opinión.

In September 2014, they switched to a tabloid format.

== Lozano family ==
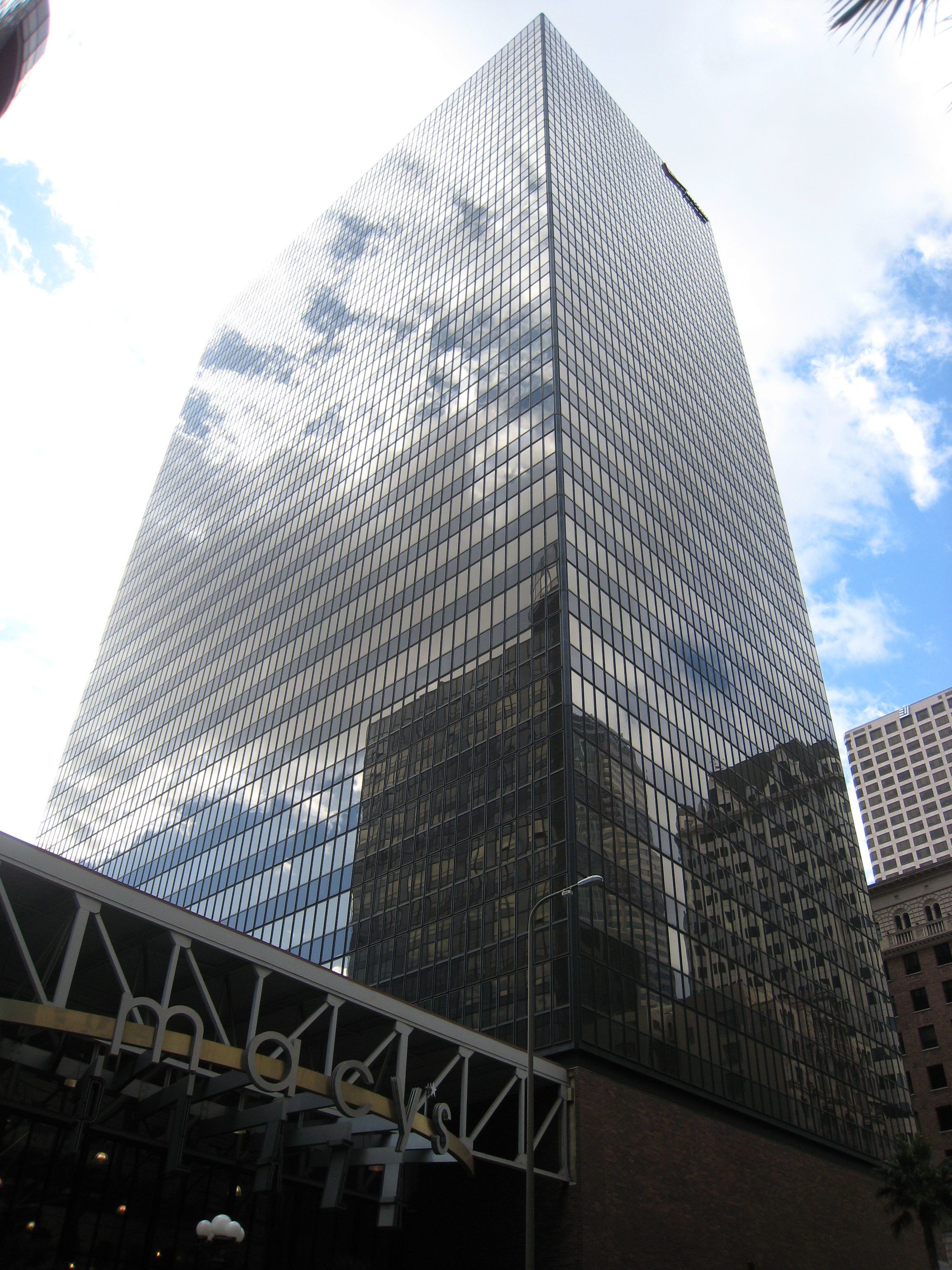
MCI Center houses the newspaper's offices

The Lozanos continued to be involved in the operations of the newspaper. Leticia Lozano, the eldest child of Ignacio E. Lozano, Jr., worked at La Opinión from 1976 to 1984, at which point she got married and moved to Italy. Her younger brother, José Ignacio Lozano, was named assistant publisher in 1977 and publisher in 1986. In 2004, La Opinión merged with New York City-based El Diario La Prensa, the oldest Spanish-language newspaper in the United States, to form ImpreMedia LLC. José Lozano became vice chairman of the new parent company, and his sister, Monica C. Lozano, also serves as senior vice president of ImpreMedia LLC. In 2004, Mónica Lozano, was named publisher and CEO of La Opinión. Monica Lozano's younger brother, Francisco Lozano, was promoted to ImpreMedia's corporate director of magazines in 2007. He previously worked as Sales Development Director for ImpreMedia and as National Sales Manager for La Opinión.

All Lozano family assets, Lozano Enterprises, are wrapped up in ImpreMedia, which was formed from the combination of Lozano Enterprises and CPK Media, in 2004. ImpreMedia LLC is the first national Spanish-language newspaper company.

In May 2012, the Lozano family sold controlling interest in La Opinión to the Argentine newspaper La Nación. Monica Lozano and the staff of La Opinión remain, but the family no longer controls the newspaper.

== Today ==
La Opinión has diversified its coverage from purely Mexican to include the Central American, South American, Cuban, Puerto Rican and Spanish populations that have grown in Los Angeles over the last quarter century. It now includes reporting on issues relevant to a wide variety of Hispanics. In the words of former publisher Ignacio E. Lozano Jr.: "Our mission was no longer to be a Mexican newspaper published in Los Angeles, but an American newspaper that happens to be published in Spanish."

Since 1986, La Opinión's editorial staff has doubled in size and the paper has grown to include bureaus in Sacramento, California, Washington, D.C., and Mexico City. In 1999 and 2000, La Opinión was recognized by the National Association of Hispanic Journalists as the Outstanding Spanish Language Daily Newspaper of the Year.

In 2006, La Opinión received the highest-ranking recognition in Spanish-language journalism, the José Ortega y Gasset Award from Spain’s El País newspaper. El País honored La Opinión for its pioneering trajectory over eighty years creating and maintaining an unprecedented media outlet for the growing Hispanic population in the United States.

In November 2007, La Opinión ranked #1 in net daily paid circulation growth among the 200 largest newspapers in America for the six-month period ending September 2007, based on the latest FAS-FAX Report from the Audit Bureau of Circulation. The daily average is based on Monday-Friday.

However, since 2008, the staff of La Opinión has dwindled and the ImpreMedia empire has grown weaker.

As of May 2012, a subsidiary of the Argentine newspaper La Nación purchased a majority share of ImpreMedia and La Opinión.

The single-copy price is $1. This price includes sales tax at newsracks; it may be higher in designated state areas.

== Columnists ==
- David Torres
- Carmen Villavicencio
- Dolores Prida
- Eridania Bidó Fernández
- Geovanny Vicente
- Gerson Borrero
- Luis Magana
- Maribel Hastings
- Mario Eduardo Concha Ampuero
- Melissa Mark-Viverito
- Virginia Gaglianone

== See also ==
- List of Spanish-language newspapers published in the United States
