= Ignacio E. Lozano Sr. =

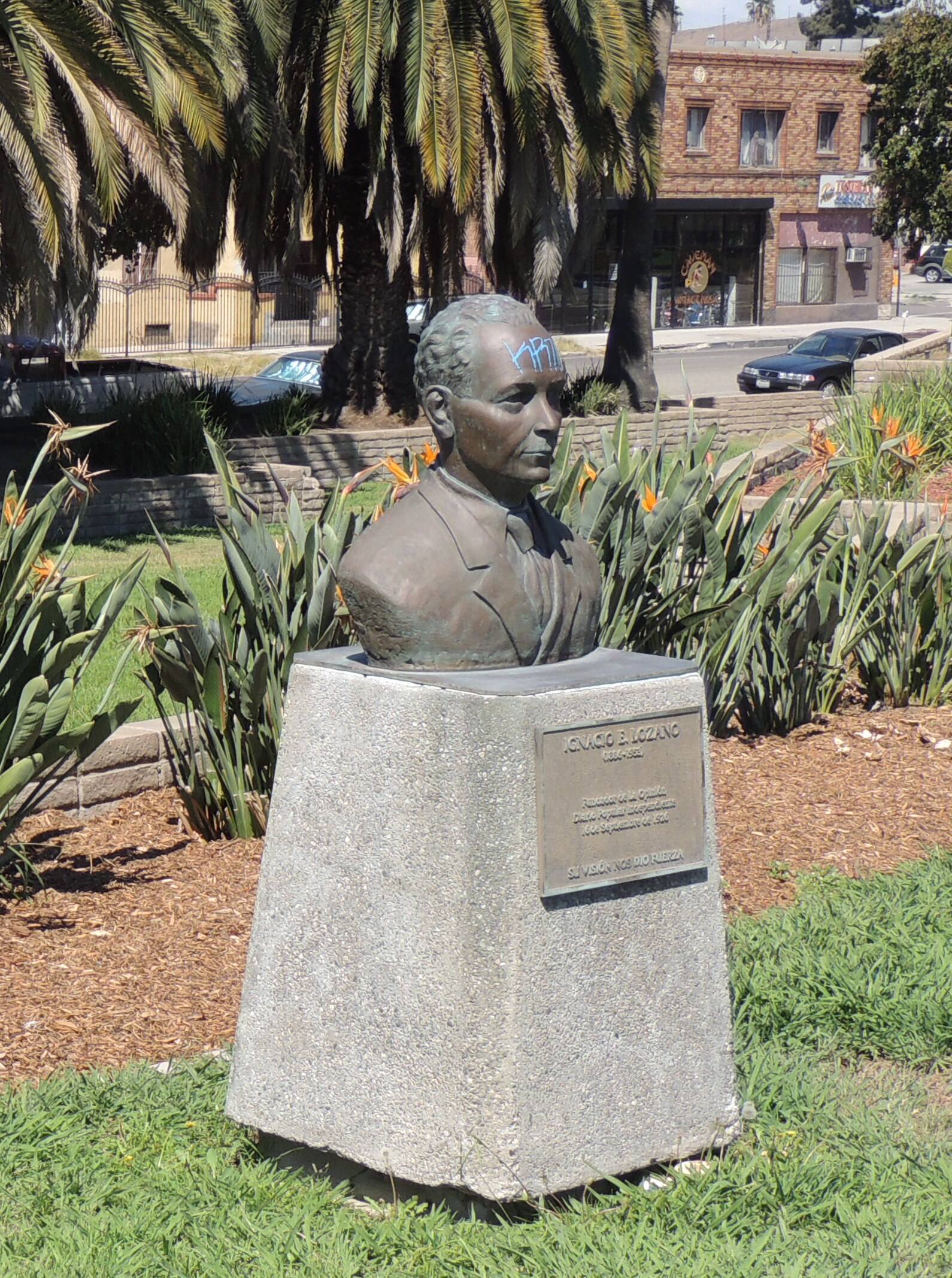
Bust of Ignacio E. Lozano in Los Angeles, California.

Ignacio Eugenio Lozano Sr. (1886-September 21, 1953) was born in Marín, Nuevo León on Mexico-Texas border. He was a famous journalist of northern Mexico, but he joined the exodus into the United States during the Mexican Revolution., He moved to San Antonio and established a Spanish language bookstore and worked on two Spanish language periodicals.

He founded La Prensa as a Spanish language daily newspaper in 1913. His granddaughter, Monica C. Lozano, would later say though La Prensa was not the first Spanish language daily, it became the largest.

He founded La Opinión in Los Angeles, home of La Prensa's biggest readership, in 1926. He and his wife, Alicia Elizondo Lozano, operated both papers, the one in San Antonio, the other in Los Angeles. After his death from cancer in 1953, his son Ignacio E. Lozano Jr. took over as publisher at La Opinión and his widow returned to San Antonio to keep La Prensa in business for ten more years.,

== Personal life ==
He was married to Alicia Elizondo de Lozano, who kept La Prensa running after his death, until she sold it in 1959. They had two children: Ignacio Eugenio Lozano Jr. (born 1927) and Maria Alicia Lozano (born 1923), who moved to Mexico City as a married woman.
