= Sandro Rosell =

Businessman and former FC Barcelona president

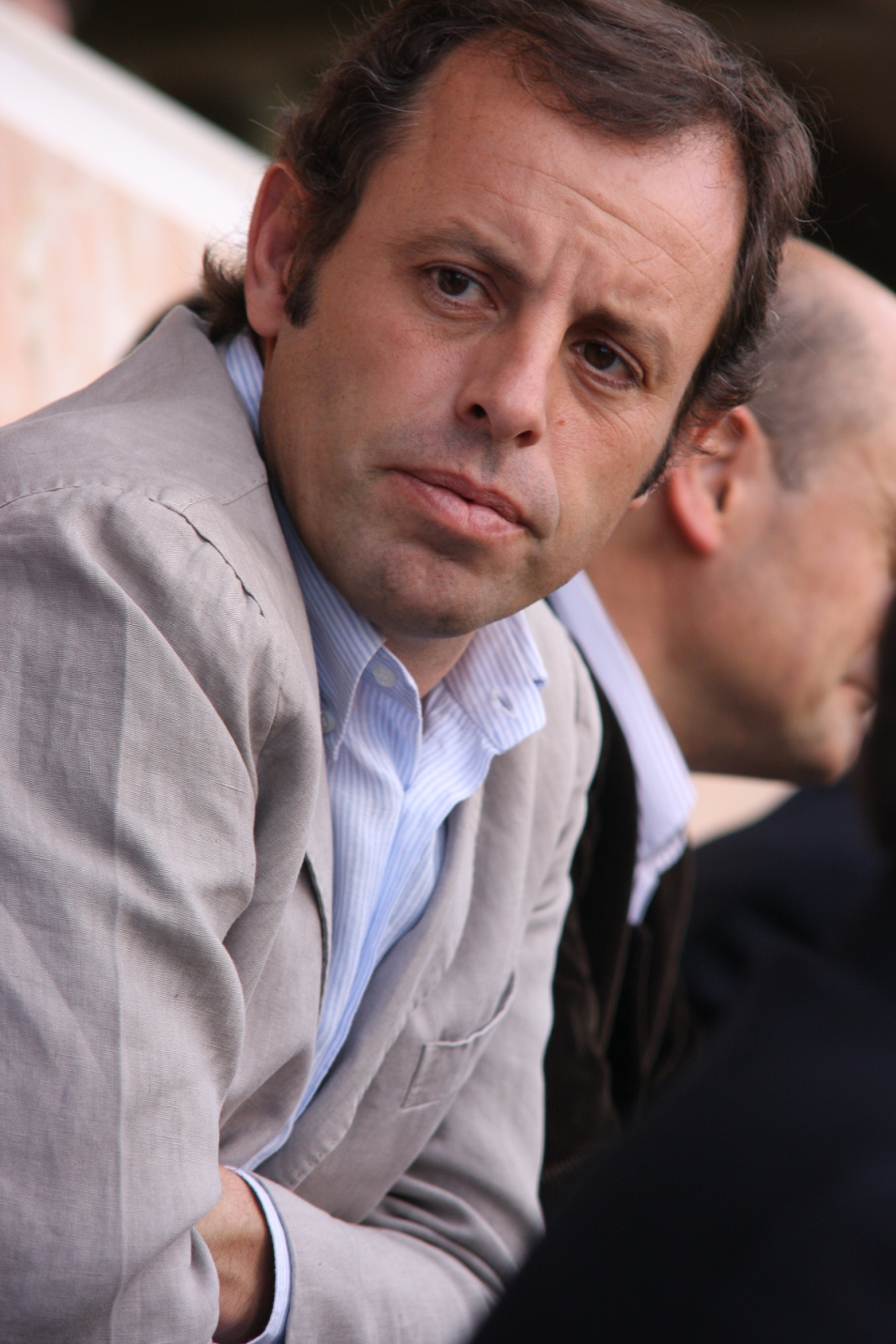
- Sandro Rosell in 2010

39th President of FC Barcelona
- In office 1 July 2010 – 23 January 2014
- Preceded by: Joan Laporta
- Succeeded by: Josep Maria Bartomeu

Personal details
- Born: Alexandre Rosell Feliu; 6 March 1964 (age 62) Barcelona, Catalonia, Spain
- Spouse: Marta Pineda
- Education: ESADE

Alexandre "Sandro" Rosell i Feliu (Catalan pronunciation: [ˈsandɾu ruˈzeʎ]; born 6 March 1964) is a Spanish businessman. He earned an MBA degree from ESADE. Rosell ran as senior adviser of Joan Laporta during the 2003 Barcelona elections and was the vice-president of sports until June 2005. He was the president of Barcelona from 2010 to 2014. In 2017, Rosell was jailed without bail as part of a money laundering investigation related to buying television rights for past matches of the Brazil national team. On 24 April 2019, after a total of 643 days of pre-trial detention and with the provisional release of Rosell having been rejected on as much as 13 occasions, Spanish courts fully acquitted Rosell.

== Barcelona ==
=== Elections in 2003 ===
Rosell and Joan Laporta joined forces in 2003 to support the latter's bid to become president of Barcelona. After winning by a large majority, Rosell attempted to make the election pledge of bringing David Beckham to the club a reality. At the time, Rosell claimed he was "80% confident" that the move would take place. Beckham, however, chose to join Barcelona's fierce rivals, Real Madrid. As a result, the Barcelona board opted to try and sign Brazilian star Ronaldinho from Paris Saint-Germain. The Catalan club were in direct competition for the Brazilian with Manchester United, who wanted him as a replacement for the England international. At a time of financial uncertainty, the capture of Ronaldinho was crucial for Barcelona. It is widely believed that Ronaldinho signed for Barcelona instead of the Premier League Champions because of his friendship with Rosell, a former Nike executive in Brazil.

Rosell resigned as vice-president of sports in June 2005, despite Barcelona winning the title that year, accusing Laporta of failing to carry their combined original plan for the club.

=== Following his resignation from the Board of Directors in 2005 ===
In 2006, Rosell released a book Benvingut al món real (Welcome to the real world), just as Barcelona were on the verge of reaching the UEFA Champions League final, which they eventually won. It was seen as a direct attack on club president Laporta after it promised to reveal the problems that had caused Rosell to resign.

When the opportunity for elections at Barcelona arose in 2006, due to a successful challenge by club members who claimed Joan Laporta had completed a four-year term, Rosell did not put his name forward to challenge his former friend. When asked if he would put his name forward in future elections, Rosell replied that he would "never say never."

After his resignation, Rosell was a critic of Laporta, criticizing his handling of problems at Barcelona and claiming that in "all areas of the club" there has been "absolute anarchy." However, he did support Laporta's choice of manager in Pep Guardiola, saying that it was "how it should be" and also supported Laporta's decision to sign an agreement with UNICEF.

=== 2010 Elections ===
Rosell announced on 27 June 2008, at a press conference, that he intended to campaign for the presidency of Barcelona in 2010 after the end of the contract of Joan Laporta. At the time, Laporta was about to face a no-confidence motion brought about by Oriol Giralt which Rosell supported. Laporta himself accused Rosell of being behind the motion. When asked why he would be voting against Laporta, Rosell said that it was because the current management "is not independent or transparent or democratic". On 13 June, Rosell was elected president of Barcelona with more than 60% of the vote of club members. He replaced outgoing President Joan Laporta on 1 July 2010.

=== Presidency ===
In July 2012, Rosell confirmed that his club Barcelona had achieved record profits of €45 million for the previous season despite his side winning neither the Liga title nor the Champions League. On 23 January 2014, Rosell resigned as president after judge Pablo Ruz ordered the start of a hearing to investigate Rosell for alleged misappropriation of funds over the signing of Brazil forward Neymar, saying Rosell could be called in person to give evidence. After Rosell resigned, his successor Josep Maria Bartomeu revealed that the true cost of the transfer was not the €57.1m announced by Rosell, but rather €86.2m, with €40m going to a company owned by Neymar's father. Barcelona was investigated for tax fraud, and Santos unsuccessfully sued to receive more of the transfer fee than the €17.1m they were initially given.

=== Major signings during presidency ===
Rank	Player	From	Transfer Fee (€ millions)	Year	Source
1.	(Brazil) Neymar	(Brazil) Santos	86.2	2013	
2.	(Spain) Cesc Fàbregas	(England) Arsenal	29+5(variables)	2011	
3.	(Chile) Alexis Sánchez	(Italy) Udinese	26+11(add ons)	2011	
4.	(Argentina) Javier Mascherano	(England) Liverpool	26.8	2010	
5.	(Cameroon) Alex Song	(England) Arsenal	19.0	2012	
6.	(Spain) Jordi Alba	(Spain) Valencia	14.0	2012	
7.	(Brazil) Adriano	(Spain) Sevilla	13.5	2010	

=== Trophies won by club during presidency ===
==== Football ====
Barcelona:

- La Liga:
  - 2010–11, 2012–13
- Copa del Rey:
  - 2011–12
- Supercopa de España:
  - 2010, 2011, 2013
- UEFA Champions League:
  - 2010–11
- UEFA Super Cup:
  - 2011
- FIFA Club World Cup:
  - 2011

FC Barcelona Femení:

- Primera División (women):
  - 2011–12, 2012–13
- Copa de la Reina de Fútbol:
  - 2011, 2013

==== Futsal ====
Barcelona Futsal:

- División de Honor / Primera División:
  - 2010–11, 2011–12, 2012–13
- Copa del Rey de Futsal:
  - 2010–11, 2011–12, 2012–13
- Copa de España (LNFS):
  - 2011, 2012, 2013
- Supercopa de España:
  - 2013
- UEFA Futsal Cup:
  - 2011–12

==== Basketball ====
Barcelona Basketball:

- Liga ACB:
  - 2010–11, 2011–12
- Copa del Rey de Baloncesto:
  - 2011, 2013
- Supercopa de España de Baloncesto:
  - 2010, 2011

==== Handball ====
Barcelona Handbol:

- Liga ASOBAL:
  - 2010–11, 2011–12, 2012–13
- Copa ASOBAL:
  - 2011–12, 2012–13, 2013–14
- Supercopa ASOBAL:
  - 2012–13, 2013–14
- EHF Champions League:
  - 2010–11
- IHF Super Globe:
  - 2013

==== Roller hockey ====
Barcelona Roller Hockey:

- OK Liga:
  - 2011–12
- Copa del Rey de Hockey Patines:
  - 2011, 2012
- Supercopa de España de Hockey Patines:
  - 2011, 2012, 2013
- Continental Cup:
  - 2010

== Business activities ==
In 2008, Rosell founded Ailanto, a sports-marketing firm dedicated to organize football events in Brazil. In November 2008, Ailanto was given the rights by the president of the Brazilian Football Confederation (CBF), Ricardo Teixeira, to organize a friendly match between Brazil and Portugal. A week before the match, to be played in Brasília, the government of the Federal District signed a contract to pay Ailanto R$9 million (US$4 million at the time) for the marketing rights and for other loosely defined services, including arranging transport and accommodation for both teams' players. That deal was investigated for padding and corruption. The public prosecutor's office in Brasília said that receipted expenditure relating to the game was only around R$1 million, and that in any case the Football Federation of Brasília (FBF), an affiliate of the CBF, had paid. It also said that, although the Federal District government bought the rights to the game, the money from ticket sales flowed to the FBF. Brasília's police force investigated irregularities and searched Ailanto's premises in Rio de Janeiro, seizing documents.
