= Cristian Domínguez (futsal player) =

Spanish futsal player

Personal information
- Full name: Cristian Domínguez Barrios
- Date of birth: 27 August 1982 (age 44)
- Place of birth: Madrid, Spain
- Height: 1.82 m (5 ft 11 1/2 in)
- Position: Goalkeeper

Senior career*
Years	Team	Apps	(Gls)
1998–2000	Leganés		
2000–2003	Caja Segovia	60	(0)
2003–2007	Cartagena	131	(3)
2007–2016	Barcelona	105	(1)
2016–2017	Benfica	0	(0)

International career
	Spain	45	
- * Club domestic league appearances and goals

Cristian Domínguez Barrios (born 27 August 1982), simply known as Cristian, is a Spanish futsal player who plays as a goalkeeper.

== Honours ==
=== Club ===
Caja Segovia

- Intercontinental Futsal Cup: 2000

Barcelona

- Primera División: 2010–11, 2011–12, 2012–13
- Copa de España: 2011, 2012, 2013
- Supercopa de España: 2000
- Copa del Rey: 2010–11, 2011–12, 2012–13, 2013–14
- UEFA Futsal Cup: 2011–12, 2013–14

Benfica

- Supertaça de Portugal: 2016

=== International ===
Spain

- UEFA Futsal Championship: 2007, 2010, 2012
- FIFA Futsal World Cup: Runner-up 2008, 2012

=== Other ===
Spanish Championship of Territorial Teams: 1998, 2000

=== Individual ===
- LNFS Best Goalkeeper: 2010–11
- LNFS Revelation Player: 2002–03
