= Adolfo Fernández Díaz =

Spanish futsal player (born 1993)

Adolfo Fernández
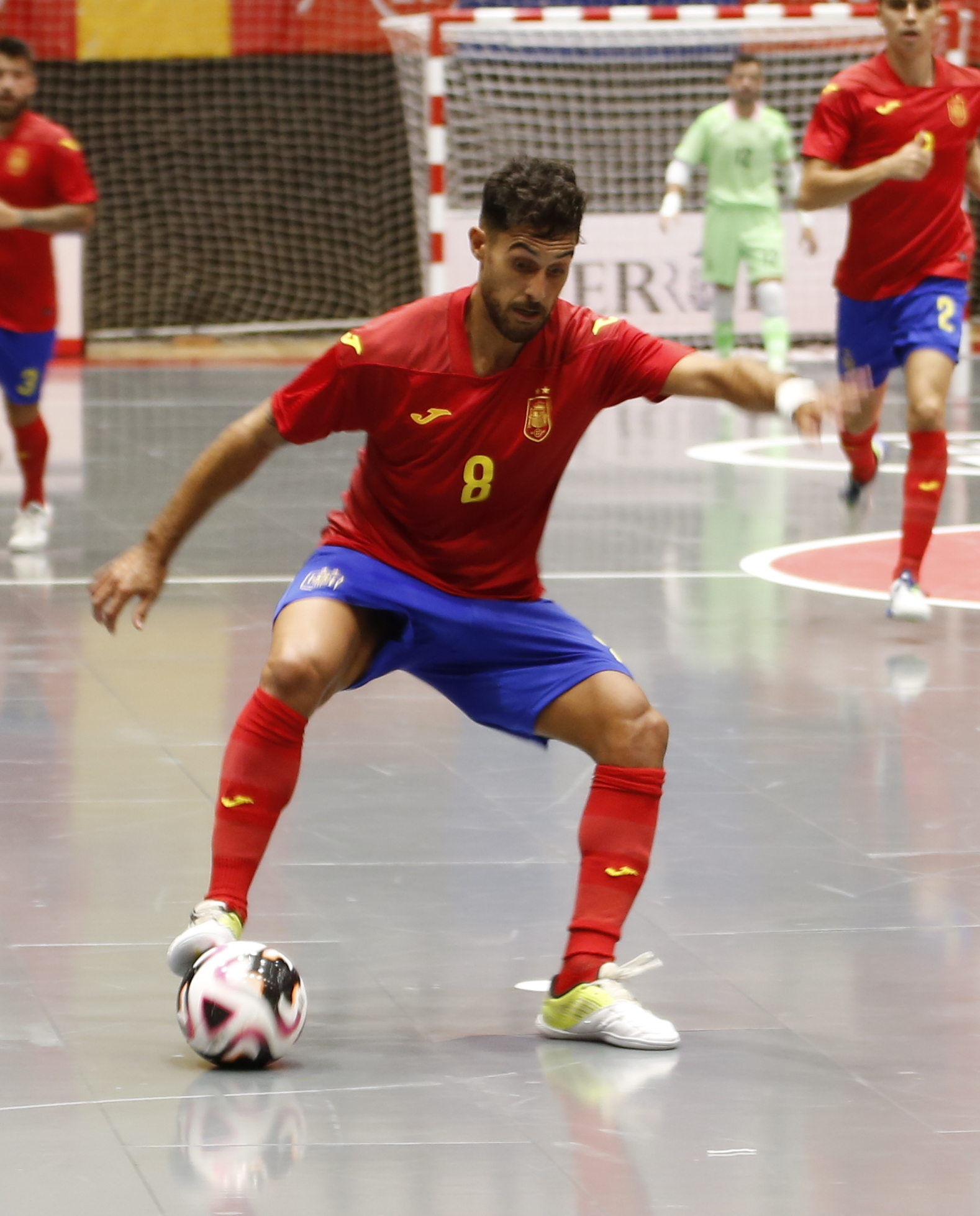

Personal information
- Full name: Adolfo Fernández Díaz
- Date of birth: 19 May 1993 (age 33)
- Place of birth: Santa Coloma de Gramenet, Spain
- Height: 1.70 m (5 ft 7 in)
- Position: Winger

Team information
- Current team: FC Barcelona
- Number: 8

Senior career*
Years	Team	Apps	(Gls)
2009–2016	FS García		
2016–	FC Barcelona		

International career^{‡}
2017–	Spain		
Medal record
Men's futsal
Representing Spain
UEFA Futsal Championship
Winner	2026 Latvia / Lithuania / Slovenia
Runner-up	2018 Slovenia
Bronze medal – third place	2022 Netherlands
- * Club domestic league appearances and goals as of 30 December 2025 ‡ National team caps and goals as of 19 August 2025

Adolfo Fernández Díaz (born 19 May 1993), also known mononymously as Adolfo, is a Spanish professional futsal player who plays as a winger for FC Barcelona and the Spain national team.

== Club career ==
Having come through the youth ranks at FS García, Fernández made his debut with the first team in 2009. After being named breakthrough player of the 2013–14 season, he signed for FC Barcelona in 2015, winning multiple trophies.

== International career ==
In 2017, coach Venancio López called up Fernández for the first time to the senior national team. With the red furies, he took part, the following year, in the UEFA Futsal Euro in Slovenia, which ended with the defeat in the final at the hands of Portugal. On 30 August 2021, he was included in the final list of players called up for the 2021 World Cup, in which Spain was eliminated in the quarter-finals. On 28 December 2021, he was included in the list of players called up for the UEFA Futsal Euro 2022, where Spain finished in third place.

In 2026, Fernández was part of the Spanish squad that won the UEFA Futsal Euro, where he scored two goals.

== Honours ==
FC Barcelona

- Primera División: 2018–19, 2020–21, 2021–22, 2022–23, 2025–26
- Copa del Rey: 2018–19, 2019–20, 2021–22, 2022–23
- Supercopa de España: 2019, 2021, 2022, 2023
- Copa de España (LNFS): 2019, 2020, 2022, 2024
- UEFA Futsal Champions League: 2019–20, 2021–22

Spain

- UEFA Futsal Championship: 2026; runner-up: 2018; third-place: 2022

Individual

- Futsal Awards Best Male Young Player in the World: 2014, 2015, 2016
