= Dídac Plana =

Spanish futsal player (born 1990)

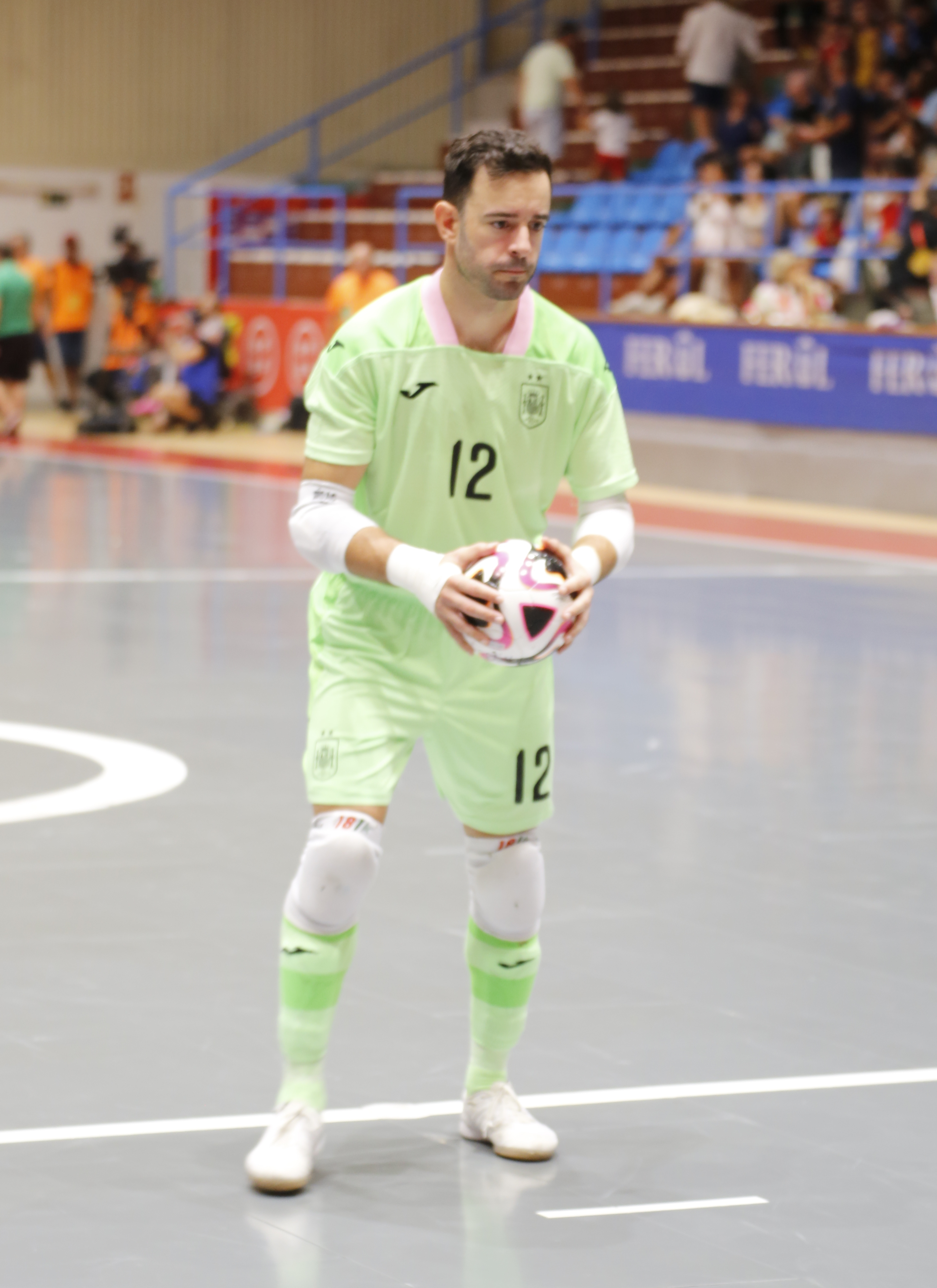

Personal information
- Full name: Dídac Plana Oltra
- Date of birth: 22 May 1990 (age 36)
- Place of birth: Arenys de Mar, Spain
- Height: 1.79 m (5 ft 10 in)
- Position: Goalkeeper

Team information
- Current team: FC Barcelona
- Number: 21

Senior career*
| Years | Team | Apps | (Gls) |
| 2008–2010 | UD Guadalajara FS | | |
| 2010–2013 | AD Sala 10 | | |
| 2013–2016 | FS García | | |
| 2016–2018 | Jaén FS | | |
| 2018– | FC Barcelona | | |

International career^{‡}
| 2018– | Spain | | |
Medal record
Men's futsal
Representing Spain
UEFA Futsal Championship
| Winner | 2026 Latvia / Lithuania / Slovenia |
| Bronze medal – third place | 2022 Netherlands |
- * Club domestic league appearances and goals as of 30 December 2025 ‡ National team caps and goals as of 19 August 2025

Dídac Plana Oltra (born 22 May 1990), also known mononymously as Dídac, is a Spanish professional futsal player who plays as a goalkeeper for FC Barcelona and the Spain national team.

== Club career ==
Having come through the youth ranks at FC Barcelona, Plana made his professional debut in 2008 with Gestesa Guadalajara in the Primera División. In 2010, he moved to Sala 10 Zaragoza, and after stints at Catgas E. Santa Coloma and Jaén Paraíso Interior, he signed for FC Barcelona for the 2018–19 season, where he won all his titles at a club level, most notably the UEFA Futsal Champions League.

== International career ==
On 2 April 2018, Plana made his debut for the senior national team in a 3–1 friendly win against Finland.

Plana played in the 2021 FIFA Futsal World Cup with the Spain national team. He won a bronze medal at the UEFA Futsal Euro 2022 with Spain.

In 2026, Plana was part of the Spanish squad that won the UEFA Futsal Euro.

== Honours ==
FC Barcelona

- Primera División: 2018–19, 2020–21, 2021–22, 2022–23, 2025–26
- Copa del Rey: 2018–19, 2019–20, 2021–22, 2022–23
- Supercopa de España: 2019, 2021, 2022, 2023
- Copa de España (LNFS): 2019, 2020, 2022, 2024
- UEFA Futsal Champions League: 2019–20, 2021–22

Spain

- UEFA Futsal Championship: 2026; third place: 2022

Individual

- Futsal Awards Best Male Goalkeeper in the World: 2022
