= Pito (futsal player) =

Brazilian futsal player

Personal information
- Full name: Jean Pierre Guisel Costa
- Date of birth: 6 November 1991 (age 34)
- Place of birth: Chapecó, Brazil
- Height: 1.85 m (6 ft 1 in)
- Position: Pivot

Team information
- Current team: FC Barcelona
- Number: 10

Youth career
- –1997: Aurora de Chapecó
- 1998–2007: AABB Chapecó
- 2010: Criciúma

Senior career*
Years	Team	Apps	(Gls)
2010	Criciúma		
2011–2012	ADESP		
2013	Concórdia		
2014–2016	Carlos Barbosa		
2016–2019	ElPozo Murcia	121	(78)
2019–2021	Inter	64	(32)
2021–	FC Barcelona	176	(119)

International career
2014–	Brazil	88	(53)
- * Club domestic league appearances and goals

Jean Pierre Guisel Costa (born 6 November 1991), known as Pito, is a Brazilian futsal player who plays for FC Barcelona and the Brazilian national futsal team as a pivot and winger.

== Honours ==
Carlos Barbosa

- Liga Nacional de Futsal (1): 2015
- Taça Brasil de Futsal (1): 2016

ElPorzo Muncia

- Supercopa de España de Futsal (1): 2016
- Copa del Rey de Futsal (1): 2016-17

Inter FS

- Primera División de Futsal (1): 2019-20
- Copa de España de Futsal (1): 2021
- Supercopa de España de Futsal (1): 2020
- Copa del Rey de Futsal (1): 2020-21

Barcelona

- Primera División de Futsal (2): 2021-22, 2022–23
- Copa de España de Futsal (2): 2022, 2024
- Supercopa de España de Futsal (2): 2021, 2022
- Copa del Rey de Futsal (1): 2022-23
- Copa Catalunya Futsal (1): 2025
- UEFA Futsal Champions League: Champion: 2021-2022

National team

- Copa América de Futsal (2): 2024, 2026
- FIFA Futsal World Cup (1): 2024
- Copa das Nações Futsal (2): 2023, 2025
- Grand Prix de Futsal (2): 2014, 2018
