= 2021–22 UEFA Futsal Champions League =

36th edition of top European men's futsal competition

- The Arena Riga in Riga hosted the final.

Tournament details
- Dates: Qualifying rounds: 20 August 2021 – 5 December 2021; Final tournament: 29 April – 1 May 2022
- Teams: Final tournament: 4 Total: 55 (from 51 associations)

Final positions
- Champions: (Spain) Barcelona (4th title)
- Runners-up: (Portugal) Sporting CP
- Third place: (Portugal) Benfica
- Fourth place: (France) ACCS

Tournament statistics
- Matches played: 124
- Goals scored: 850 (6.85 per match)
- Attendance: 47,731 (385 per match)
- Top scorer(s): Season total: (Bosnia and Herzegovina) Mirko Marinković (11 goals); Final tournament: (Brazil) Ferrão (Brazil) Dyego Zuffo (Italy) Alex Merlim (France) Nelson Lutin (Iran) Hossein Tayyebi (2 goals each)

The 2021–22 UEFA Futsal Champions League was the 36th edition of Europe's premier club futsal tournament, and the 21st edition organized by UEFA. It was also the fourth edition since the tournament was rebranded from "UEFA Futsal Cup" to UEFA Futsal Champions League.

Sporting CP, the title holders, entered in the main round. They lost 4–0 in the final against Barcelona, who won their fourth title.

== Association team allocation ==
A total of 55 teams from 51 of the 55 UEFA member associations participated in the 2021–22 UEFA Futsal Champions League. The association ranking based on the UEFA futsal national team coefficients was used to determine the number of participating teams for each association:

- Associations 1–3 (since the title holders were in the top three) each had two teams qualify.
- The winners of the 2020–21 UEFA Futsal Champions League qualified automatically and its association may have entered a second team. If the title-holders' association was among the three best ranked associations, the fourth ranked association was also entitled to enter a second team.
- The remaining associations had one team qualify.

=== Association ranking ===
The UEFA futsal national team coefficients at the end of April 2020, used to determine the number of teams each association was entitled to enter, was as follows.

Association ranking for 2021–22 UEFA Champions League

Rank	Association	Coeff.	Teams
1	Spain	2204.047	2
2	Portugal (TH)	2116.631	2
3	Russia	2098.095	2
4	Kazakhstan	2073.313	2
5	Serbia	2012.285	1
6	Azerbaijan	1990.738	1
7	Croatia	1958.361	1
8	Italy	1928.482	1
9	Ukraine	1896.725	1
10	Czech Republic	1872.788	1
11	Slovenia	1823.765	1
12	Romania	1790.859	1
13	Hungary	1771.058	1
14	France	1717.830	1
15	Finland	1715.791	1
16	Slovakia	1699.141	1
17	Belarus	1682.792	1
18	Bosnia and Herzegovina	1669.033	1
19	Poland	1643.059	1

Rank	Association	Coeff.	Teams
20	Netherlands	1641.410	1
21	Belgium	1635.426	1
22	Georgia	1627.160	1
23	Latvia	1470.151	1
24	Moldova	1454.560	1
25	North Macedonia	1423.493	1
26	Albania	1336.154	1
27	Norway	1319.691	1
28	Turkey	1276.953	1
29	England	1269.457	1
30	Kosovo	1264.428	1
31	Montenegro	1260.291	1
32	Sweden	1235.426	1
33	Denmark	1225.816	1
34	Germany	1181.253	1
35	Switzerland	1168.489	1
36	Greece	1164.918	1
37	Armenia	1158.737	1

Rank	Association	Coeff.	Teams
38	Bulgaria	1153.228	1
39	Cyprus	1145.801	1
40	Lithuania	1131.401	1
41	Israel	1027.399	1
42	Wales	1011.432	1
43	Andorra	910.044	1
44	San Marino	894.052	1
45	Estonia	849.940	1
46	Malta	837.308	1
47	Scotland	816.083	DNE
48	Gibraltar	780.661	1
49	Austria	728.018	1
50	Northern Ireland	724.015	1
NR	Luxembourg	—	1
NR	Republic of Ireland	—	1
NR	Faroe Islands	—	DNE
NR	Iceland	—	DNE
NR	Liechtenstein	—	DNE

Notes

- TH – Additional berth for title holders
- NR – No rank (association national team had been inactive on the previous 36 months)
- DNE – Did not enter

=== Distribution ===
For the 2021–22 UEFA Futsal Champions League, the clubs' entry round was determined by their UEFA futsal club coefficients, which took into account their performance from the previous three seasons. The following was the access list for the season.

Access list for 2021–22 UEFA Futsal Champions League
		Teams entering in this round	Teams advancing from previous round
Preliminary round (32 teams)		32 teams ranked 23–54	
Main round	Path A (16 teams)	Title holders; 15 teams ranked 1–11 and 16–19	
Main round	Path B (16 teams)	7 teams ranked 12–15 and 20–22	8 group winners from preliminary round; Best preliminary round runners-up
Elite round (16 teams)			4 group winners from main round path A; 4 group runners-up from main round path A; 4 group third-placed team from main round path A; 4 group winners from main round path B
Final tournament (4 teams)			4 group winners from elite round

=== Teams ===
Below were the participating teams of the 2021–22 UEFA Futsal Champions League (with their ranking among participating teams), grouped by their starting round and path for the main round.

Main round Path A
Team	Rank
(Portugal) Sporting CP	TH
(Spain) Barcelona	1
(Kazakhstan) Kairat	2
(Portugal) Benfica	3
(Spain) Levante	4
(Russia) Tyumen	5
(Slovenia) Dobovec	6
(Russia) Sinara Ekaterinburg	7
(Kazakhstan) Atyrau	8
(Lithuania) Kauno Žalgiris	9
(Italy) Pesaro	10
(Poland) Rekord Bielsko-Biała	11
(Romania) Csíkszereda	16
(Slovakia) MIMEL Lučenec	17
(Belarus) Viten Orsha	18
(Netherlands) Hovocubo	19

Main round Path B
Team	Rank
(Croatia) Olmissum	12
(Bosnia and Herzegovina) Mostar	13
(France) ACCS	14
(Czech Republic) Plzeň	15
(Armenia) Leo	20
(Ukraine) Uragan	21
(Belgium) Halle-Gooik	22

Preliminary round
Team	Rank
(Malta) Luxol St Andrews	23
(Germany) TSV Weilimdorf	24
(Azerbaijan) Araz Naxçivan	25
(Cyprus) APOEL Futsal	26
(Denmark) Gentofte	27
(Hungary) Haladás	28
(Switzerland) Futsal Minerva	29
(Serbia) FON	30
(Finland) Kampuksen Dynamo	31
(Kosovo) Liqeni	32
(Georgia (country)) CIU	33
(Luxembourg) Differdange 03	34
(North Macedonia) Proekt	35
(Greece) Doukas	36
(Moldova) Dinamo Plus	37
(Estonia) Viimsi	38
(Sweden) Hammarby IF	39
(England) Helvécia	40
(Latvia) Raba	41
(Bulgaria) Varna City	42
(Albania) Tirana	43
(Austria) Diamant Linz	44
(Republic of Ireland) Blue Magic	45
(Israel) Ashdod Dolphins	46
(Norway) Utleira	47
(Turkey) Tavşançalı	48
(Wales) Cefn Druids	49
(Gibraltar) Europa	50
(Montenegro) Titograd	51
(Northern Ireland) Sparta Belfast	52
(San Marino) Fiorentino	53
(Andorra) Encamp	54

== Format ==
In this season, the tournament returned to the mini-tournament format consisting of three qualifying rounds and the final tournament. The qualifying rounds consisted of the following stages:

- Preliminary round: 32 teams entering in this round were divided in eight groups of four teams with the winners and the best runners-up advancing to the next round.
- Main round:
  - Path A: 16 teams entering in this round were divided in four groups of four teams, with the winners, runners-up and third-placed teams advancing to the next round.
  - Path B: 7 teams which entered in this round and the 9 teams advancing from the preliminary round were divided in four groups of four teams, with the winners advancing to the next round.
- Elite round: 16 teams were divided in four groups of four teams, with the winners qualifying to the final tournament.

In each group, teams played against each other in a single round-robin format hosted by one of the participating teams.

The final tournament was played at a centralized location and consisted of single-legged semi-finals, third-place play-off and final. If scores were level at the end of normal time, extra time was played, followed by a penalty shoot-out if the scores remained tied.

=== Tiebreakers ===
Teams were ranked according to points (3 points for a win, 1 point for a draw, 0 points for a loss). If two or more teams were tied on points, the following tiebreaking criteria were applied, in the order given, to determine the rankings (see Article 14 Equality of points – mini-tournaments, Regulations of the UEFA Futsal Champions League):

1. Points in head-to-head matches among the tied teams;
2. Goal difference in head-to-head matches among the tied teams;
3. Goals scored in head-to-head matches among the tied teams;
4. If more than two teams were tied, and after applying all head-to-head criteria above, a subset of teams are still tied, all head-to-head criteria above were reapplied exclusively to this subset of teams;
5. Goal difference in all group matches;
6. Goals scored in all group matches;
7. Disciplinary points (direct red card = 3 points; double yellow card = 3 points; single yellow card = 1 point);
8. UEFA futsal club coefficients.

For the ranking of second-placed teams in the preliminary round, teams are also ranked according to points, with the following tiebreakers applying in case of a tie.

1. Goal difference in all group matches;
2. Goals scored in all group matches;
3. Disciplinary points (direct red card = 3 points; double yellow card = 3 points; single yellow card = 1 point);
4. UEFA futsal club coefficients.

== Schedule ==
The schedule of the competition was as follows (all draws were held at the UEFA headquarters in Nyon, Switzerland).

Schedule for 2021–22 UEFA Futsal Champions League
Phase	Round	Draw	Dates
Qualifying stage	Preliminary round	7 July 2021	20–25 August 2021
Qualifying stage	Main round	30 August 2021	26–31 October 2021
Qualifying stage	Elite round	3 November 2021	30 November – 5 December 2021
Final tournament	Semi-finals	7 April 2022	29 April 2022
Final tournament	Third-place play-off & final	7 April 2022	1 May 2022

== Preliminary round ==
The draw for the preliminary round was held on 7 July 2021, 14:00 CEST. The preliminary round was played from 21 to 25 October 2021. The winners of each group and the best runners-up advanced to the main round Path B.

Times are CET (UTC+1), as listed by UEFA (local times, if different, are in parentheses).

=== Seeding ===
A total of 32 teams played in the preliminary round. Seeding of teams was based on their 2021 UEFA futsal club coefficients. Eight teams were pre-selected as hosts and were first drawn from a separate pot to their corresponding seeding position. The remaining teams were then drawn from their respective pots to their corresponding seeding position. Due to political reasons, teams from Kosovo and Serbia could not be drawn into the same group.

Seeding position 1	Seeding position 2	Seeding position 3	Seeding position 4
(Malta) Luxol St Andrews; (Germany) TSV Weilimdorf (H); (Azerbaijan) Araz Naxçivan; (Cyprus) APOEL Futsal; (Denmark) Gentofte; (Hungary) Haladás; (Switzerland) Futsal Minerva (H); (Serbia) FON	(Finland) Kampuksen Dynamo; (Kosovo) Liqeni; (Georgia (country)) CIU; (Luxembourg) Differdange 03; (North Macedonia) Proekt (H); (Greece) Doukas (H); (Moldova) Dinamo Plus; (Estonia) Viimsi (H)	(Sweden) Hammarby IF; (England) Helvécia; (Latvia) Raba (H); (Bulgaria) Varna City; (Albania) Tirana (H); (Austria) Diamant Linz; (Republic of Ireland) Blue Magic; (Israel) Ashdod Dolphins	(Norway) Utleira; (Turkey) Tavşançalı; (Wales) Cefn Druids; (Gibraltar) Europa; (Montenegro) Titograd (H); (Northern Ireland) Sparta Belfast; (San Marino) Fiorentino; (Andorra) Encamp

Notes

- H – Mini-tournament hosts

=== Group A ===
Pos	Team	Pld	W	D	L	GF	GA	GD	Pts	Qualification
1	(Malta) Luxol St Andrews	3	3	0	0	18	0	+18	9	Advance to main round
2	(North Macedonia) Proekt (H)	3	2	0	1	14	6	+8	6	
3	(Wales) Cefn Druids	3	1	0	2	6	15	−9	3	
4	(Israel) Ashdod Dolphins	3	0	0	3	2	19	−17	0	

Source: UEFA
Rules for classification: Tiebreakers
(H) Hosts
21 August 2021
17:00

Luxol St Andrews (Malta)	5–0	(Wales) Cefn Druids
	Report

Sport Hall "26-ti April", Gevgelija
Referee: Filipe Santos (POR), Damian Grabowski (POL), Telmen Undrakh (NOR)
21 August 2021
20:00

Ashdod Dolphins (Israel)	0–6	(North Macedonia) Proekt
	Report

Sport Hall "26-ti April", Gevgelija
Referee: Alem Bajrović (BIH), Telmen Undrakh (NOR), Damian Grabowski (POL)

22 August 2021
17:00

Ashdod Dolphins (Israel)	0–8	(Malta) Luxol St Andrews
	Report

Sport Hall "26-ti April", Gevgelija
Referee: Damian Grabowski (POL), Alem Bajrović (BIH), Filipe Santos (POR)
22 August 2021
20:00

Proekt (North Macedonia)	8–1	(Wales) Cefn Druids
	Report

Sport Hall "26-ti April", Gevgelija
Referee: Telmen Undrakh (NOR), Filipe Santos (POR), Alem Bajrović (BIH)

24 August 2021
17:00

Cefn Druids (Wales)	5–2	(Israel) Ashdod Dolphins
	Report

Sport Hall "26-ti April", Gevgelija
Referee: Alem Bajrović (BIH), Telmen Undrakh (NOR), Filipe Santos (POR)
24 August 2021
20:00

Proekt (North Macedonia)	0–5	(Malta) Luxol St Andrews
	Report

Sport Hall "26-ti April", Gevgelija
Referee: Damian Grabowski (POL), Filipe Santos (POR), Alem Bajrović (BIH)

=== Group B ===
Pos	Team	Pld	W	D	L	GF	GA	GD	Pts	Qualification
1	(Moldova) Dinamo Plus	3	3	0	0	10	6	+4	9	Advance to main round
2	(Switzerland) Futsal Minerva (H)	3	2	0	1	25	6	+19	6	
3	(Bulgaria) Varna City	3	1	0	2	4	7	−3	3	
4	(San Marino) Fiorentino	3	0	0	3	4	24	−20	0	

Source: UEFA
Rules for classification: Tiebreakers
(H) Hosts
22 August 2021
13:00

Dinamo Plus (Moldova)	3–2	(San Marino) Fiorentino
	Report

Sporthalle Weissenstein, Bern
Attendance: 20
Referee: Giulio Colombin (ITA), Denys Kutsyi (UKR), George Jansizian (SWE)
22 August 2021
16:00

Varna City (Bulgaria)	0–4	(Switzerland) Futsal Minerva
	Report

Sporthalle Weissenstein, Bern
Attendance: 300
Referee: Ingo Heemsoth (GER), George Jansizian (SWE), Denys Kutsyi (UKR)

23 August 2021
16:00

Varna City (Bulgaria)	0–2	(Moldova) Dinamo Plus
	Report

Sporthalle Weissenstein, Bern
Referee: Denys Kutsyi (UKR), Ingo Heemsoth (GER), Giulio Colombin (ITA)
23 August 2021
19:00

Futsal Minerva (Switzerland)	17–1	(San Marino) Fiorentino
	Report

Sporthalle Weissenstein, Bern
Attendance: 100
Referee: George Jansizian (SWE), Giulio Colombin (ITA), Ingo Heemsoth (GER)

25 August 2021
15:00

Fiorentino (San Marino)	1–4	(Bulgaria) Varna City
	Report

Sporthalle Weissenstein, Bern
Referee: Denys Kutsyi (UKR), George Jansizian (SWE), Ingo Heemsoth (GER)
25 August 2021
19:00

Futsal Minerva (Switzerland)	4–5	(Moldova) Dinamo Plus
	Report

Sporthalle Weissenstein, Bern
Attendance: 500
Referee: Giulio Colombin (ITA), Ingo Heemsoth (GER), George Jansizian (SWE)

=== Group C ===
Pos	Team	Pld	W	D	L	GF	GA	GD	Pts	Qualification
1	(Hungary) Haladás	3	3	0	0	12	6	+6	9	Advance to main round
2	(Luxembourg) Differdange 03	3	1	0	2	9	10	−1	3	
3	(Albania) Tirana (H)	3	1	0	2	8	9	−1	3	
4	(Norway) Utleira	3	1	0	2	7	11	−4	3	

Source: UEFA
Rules for classification: Tiebreakers
(H) Hosts
21 August 2021
17:00

Haladás (Hungary)	5–1	(Norway) Utleira
	Report

Hall Tirana Olimpik Park, Tirana
Attendance: 50
Referee: Hikmat Qafarli (AZE), Stephen Vella (MLT), Raafat Al Hamola (ISR)
21 August 2021
20:30

Differdange 03 (Luxembourg)	2–4	(Albania) Tirana
	Report

Hall Tirana Olimpik Park, Tirana
Attendance: 100
Referee: Gordon Mccabe (SCO), Raafat Al Hamola (ISR), Stephen Vella (MLT)

22 August 2021
17:00

Differdange 03 (Luxembourg)	3–4	(Hungary) Haladás
	Report

Hall Tirana Olimpik Park, Tirana
Attendance: 30
Referee: Stephen Vella (MLT), Gordon Mccabe (SCO), Hikmat Qafarli (AZE)
22 August 2021
20:30

Tirana (Albania)	2–4	(Norway) Utleira
	Report

Hall Tirana Olimpik Park, Tirana
Attendance: 100
Referee: Raafat Al Hamola (ISR), Hikmat Qafarli (AZE), Gordon Mccabe (SCO)

24 August 2021
17:00

Utleira (Norway)	2–4	(Luxembourg) Differdange 03
	Report

Hall Tirana Olimpik Park, Tirana
Referee: Hikmat Qafarli (AZE), Raafat Al Hamola (ISR), Stephen Vella (MLT)
24 August 2021
20:30

Tirana (Albania)	2–3	(Hungary) Haladás
	Report

Hall Tirana Olimpik Park, Tirana
Attendance: 80
Referee: Gordon Mccabe (SCO), Stephen Vella (MLT), Raafat Al Hamola (ISR)

=== Group D ===
Pos	Team	Pld	W	D	L	GF	GA	GD	Pts	Qualification
1	(Sweden) Hammarby IF	3	2	0	1	16	9	+7	6	Advance to main round
2	(Denmark) Gentofte	3	2	0	1	12	11	+1	6	
3	(Estonia) Viimsi (H)	3	2	0	1	16	7	+9	6	
4	(Northern Ireland) Sparta Belfast	3	0	0	3	5	22	−17	0	

Source: UEFA
Rules for classification: Tiebreakers
(H) Hosts
21 August 2021
15:00 (16:00 EEST)

Gentofte (Denmark)	3–2	(Northern Ireland) Sparta Belfast
	Report

Viimsi Kooli Spordikeskus, Haabneeme
Attendance: 25
Referee: Ruben Cardoso (POR), Bogdan Hanceariuc (ROU), Joern Te Kloeze (NED)
21 August 2021
18:30 (19:30 EEST)

Hammarby IF (Sweden)	3–1	(Estonia) Viimsi
	Report

Viimsi Kooli Spordikeskus, Haabneeme
Attendance: 200
Referee: Michael Christofides (CYP), Joern Te Kloeze (NED), Bogdan Hanceariuc (ROU)

22 August 2021
15:00 (16:00 EEST)

Hammarby IF (Sweden)	5–6	(Denmark) Gentofte
	Report

Viimsi Kooli Spordikeskus, Haabneeme
Attendance: 25
Referee: Joern Te Kloeze (NED), Ruben Cardoso (POR), Michael Christofides (CYP)
22 August 2021
18:30 (19:30 EEST)

Viimsi (Estonia)	11–1	(Northern Ireland) Sparta Belfast
	Report

Viimsi Kooli Spordikeskus, Haabneeme
Referee: Bogdan Hanceariuc (ROU), Michael Christofides (CYP), Ruben Cardoso (POR)

24 August 2021
15:00 (16:00 EEST)

Sparta Belfast (Northern Ireland)	2–8	(Sweden) Hammarby IF
	Report

Viimsi Kooli Spordikeskus, Haabneeme
Attendance: 20
Referee: Bogdan Hanceariuc (ROU), Joern Te Kloeze (NED), Michael Christofides (CYP)
24 August 2021
18:30 (19:30 EEST)

Viimsi (Estonia)	4–3	(Denmark) Gentofte
	Report

Viimsi Kooli Spordikeskus, Haabneeme
Attendance: 150
Referee: Ruben Cardoso (POR), Michael Christofides (CYP), Joern Te Kloeze (NED)

=== Group E ===
Pos	Team	Pld	W	D	L	GF	GA	GD	Pts	Qualification
1	(Serbia) KMF FON	3	3	0	0	10	2	+8	9	Advance to main round
2	(Montenegro) Titograd (H)	3	2	0	1	6	3	+3	6	
3	(Republic of Ireland) Blue Magic	3	1	0	2	6	9	−3	3	
4	(Georgia (country)) CIU	3	0	0	3	2	10	−8	0	

Source: UEFA
Rules for classification: Tiebreakers
(H) Hosts
21 August 2021
17:00

KMF FON (Serbia)	4–1	(Republic of Ireland) Blue Magic
	Report

Moraca Hall, Podgorica
Attendance: 42
Referee: Yiangos Yiangou (CYP), Jernej Petek (SVN), Done Ristovski (MKD)
21 August 2021
20:30

CIU (Georgia (country))	0–2	(Montenegro) Titograd
	Report

Moraca Hall, Podgorica
Attendance: 50
Referee: Paavo Komppa (FIN), Done Ristovski (MKD), Jernej Petek (SVN)

22 August 2021
17:00

CIU (Georgia (country))	0–3	(Serbia) KMF FON
	Report

Moraca Hall, Podgorica
Attendance: 11
Referee: Jernej Petek (SVN), Yiangos Yiangou (CYP), Paavo Komppa (FIN)
22 August 2021
20:30

Titograd (Montenegro)	3–0	(Republic of Ireland) Blue Magic
	Report

Moraca Hall, Podgorica
Attendance: 63
Referee: Done Ristovski (MKD), Paavo Komppa (FIN), Yiangos Yiangou (CYP)

24 August 2021
17:00

Blue Magic (Republic of Ireland)	5–2	(Georgia (country)) CIU
	Report

Moraca Hall, Podgorica
Attendance: 28
Referee: Yiangos Yiangou (CYP), Jernej Petek (SVN), Paavo Komppa (FIN)
24 August 2021
20:30

Titograd (Montenegro)	1–3	(Serbia) KMF FON
	Report

Moraca Hall, Podgorica
Attendance: 348
Referee: Done Ristovski (MKD), Paavo Komppa (FIN), Jernej Petek (SVN)

=== Group F ===
Pos	Team	Pld	W	D	L	GF	GA	GD	Pts	Qualification
1	(Finland) Kampuksen Dynamo	3	2	1	0	23	7	+16	7	Advance to main round
2	(Azerbaijan) Araz Naxçivan	3	2	1	0	21	10	+11	7	Advance to main round
3	(Latvia) Raba (H)	3	1	0	2	12	16	−4	3	
4	(Gibraltar) Europa	3	0	0	3	8	31	−23	0	

Source: UEFA
Rules for classification: Tiebreakers
(H) Hosts
21 August 2021
13:00 (14:00 EEST)

Araz Naxçivan (Azerbaijan)	9–2	(Gibraltar) Europa
	Report

Salaspils sporta nams, Salaspils
Attendance: 25
Referee: Dario Pezzuto (ITA), Dražen Vukčević (MNE), Panagiotis Ntalas (GRE)
21 August 2021
18:00 (19:00 EEST)

Kampuksen Dynamo (Finland)	5–0	(Latvia) Raba
	Report

Salaspils sporta nams, Salaspils
Attendance: 97
Referee: Daniele D'adamo (SMR), Panagiotis Ntalas (GRE), Dražen Vukčević (MNE)

22 August 2021
13:00 (14:00 EEST)

Kampuksen Dynamo (Finland)	4–4	(Azerbaijan) Araz Naxçivan
	Report

Salaspils sporta nams, Salaspils
Referee: Dražen Vukčević (MNE), Dario Pezzuto (ITA), Daniele D'adamo (SMR)
22 August 2021
18:00 (19:00 EEST)

Raba (Latvia)	8–3	(Gibraltar) Europa
	Report

Salaspils sporta nams, Salaspils
Attendance: 29
Referee: Panagiotis Ntalas (GRE), Daniele D'adamo (SMR), Dario Pezzuto (ITA)

24 August 2021
13:00 (14:00 EEST)

Europa (Gibraltar)	3–14	(Finland) Kampuksen Dynamo
	Report

Salaspils sporta nams, Salaspils
Referee: Daniele D'adamo (SMR), Panagiotis Ntalas (GRE), Dražen Vukčević (MNE)
24 August 2021
18:00 (19:00 EEST)

Raba (Latvia)	4–8	(Azerbaijan) Araz Naxçivan
	Report

Salaspils sporta nams, Salaspils
Attendance: 32
Referee: Dario Pezzuto (ITA), Dražen Vukčević (MNE), Panagiotis Ntalas (GRE)

=== Group G ===
Pos	Team	Pld	W	D	L	GF	GA	GD	Pts	Qualification
1	(Austria) Diamant Linz	3	2	1	0	22	10	+12	7	Advance to main round
2	(Greece) Doukas (H)	3	2	1	0	13	6	+7	7	
3	(Andorra) Encamp	3	1	0	2	2	16	−14	3	
4	(Cyprus) APOEL Futsal	3	0	0	3	9	14	−5	0	

Source: UEFA
Rules for classification: Tiebreakers
(H) Hosts
21 August 2021
15:00 (16:00 EEST)

APOEL Futsal (Cyprus)	1–2	(Andorra) Encamp
	Report

Dais Sports Hall, Athens
Attendance: 46
Referee: Javier Moreno (ESP), Filip Nešněra (CZE), Jagnar Jakobson (EST)
21 August 2021
19:00 (20:00 EEST)

Diamant Linz (Austria)	4–4	(Greece) Doukas
	Report

Dais Sports Hall, Athens
Attendance: 115
Referee: Nebojša Panić (SRB), Jagnar Jakobson (EST), Filip Nešněra (CZE)

22 August 2021
15:00 (16:00 EEST)

Doukas (Greece)	4–0	(Andorra) Encamp
	Report

Dais Sports Hall, Athens
Attendance: 76
Referee: Jagnar Jakobson (EST), Javier Moreno (ESP), Nebojša Panić (SRB)
22 August 2021
19:00 (20:00 EEST)

Diamant Linz (Austria)	7–6	(Cyprus) APOEL Futsal
	Report

Dais Sports Hall, Athens
Attendance: 48
Referee: Filip Nešněra (CZE), Nebojša Panić (SRB), Javier Moreno (ESP)

24 August 2021
15:00 (16:00 EEST)

Encamp (Andorra)	0–11	(Austria) Diamant Linz
	Report

Dais Sports Hall, Athens
Attendance: 50
Referee: Javier Moreno (ESP), Jagnar Jakobson (EST), Nebojša Panić (SRB)
24 August 2021
19:00 (20:00 EEST)

Doukas (Greece)	5–2	(Cyprus) APOEL Futsal
	Report

Dais Sports Hall, Athens
Attendance: 123
Referee: Filip Nešněra (CZE), Nebojša Panić (SRB), Javier Moreno (ESP)

=== Group H ===
Pos	Team	Pld	W	D	L	GF	GA	GD	Pts	Qualification
1	(Kosovo) Liqeni	3	3	0	0	15	8	+7	9	Advance to main round
2	(Germany) TSV Weilimdorf (H)	3	2	0	1	19	11	+8	6	
3	(England) Helvécia	3	1	0	2	20	19	+1	3	
4	(Turkey) Tavşançalı	3	0	0	3	4	20	−16	0	

Source: UEFA
Rules for classification: Tiebreakers
(H) Hosts
21 August 2021
17:00

Liqeni (Kosovo)	5–0	(Turkey) Tavşançalı
	Report

Glaspalast Sindelfingen, Sindelfingen
Attendance: 80
Referee: Pablo Delgado (ESP), Marco Rothenfluh (SUI), Michael Lima (LUX)
21 August 2021
20:00

Helvécia (England)	7–9	(Germany) TSV Weilimdorf
	Report

Glaspalast Sindelfingen, Sindelfingen
Attendance: 310
Referee: Kaloyan Kirilov (BUL), Michael Lima (LUX), Marco Rothenfluh (SUI)

22 August 2021
17:00

Helvécia (England)	6–7	(Kosovo) Liqeni
	Report

Glaspalast Sindelfingen, Sindelfingen
Attendance: 60
Referee: Marco Rothenfluh (SUI), Kaloyan Kirilov (BUL), Pablo Delgado (ESP)
22 August 2021
20:00

TSV Weilimdorf (Germany)	8–1	(Turkey) Tavşançalı
	Report

Glaspalast Sindelfingen, Sindelfingen
Attendance: 220
Referee: Michael Lima (LUX), Pablo Delgado (ESP), Kaloyan Kirilov (BUL)

24 August 2021
17:00

Tavşançalı (Turkey)	2–8	(England) Helvécia
	Report

Glaspalast Sindelfingen, Sindelfingen
Attendance: 40
Referee: Michael Lima (LUX), Kaloyan Kirilov (BUL), Marco Rothenfluh (SUI)
24 August 2021
20:00

TSV Weilimdorf (Germany)	2–3	(Kosovo) Liqeni
	Report

Glaspalast Sindelfingen, Sindelfingen
Attendance: 390
Referee: Pablo Delgado (ESP), Marco Rothenfluh (SUI), Kaloyan Kirilov (BUL)

=== Ranking of second-placed teams ===
Pos	Grp	Team	Pld	W	D	L	GF	GA	GD	Pts	Qualification
1	F	(Azerbaijan) Araz Naxçivan	3	2	1	0	21	10	+11	7	Advance to main round
2	G	(Greece) Doukas	3	2	1	0	13	6	+7	7	
3	B	(Switzerland) Futsal Minerva	3	2	0	1	25	6	+19	6	
4	H	(Germany) TSV Weilimdorf	3	2	0	1	19	11	+8	6	
5	A	(North Macedonia) Proekt	3	2	0	1	14	6	+8	6	
6	E	(Montenegro) Titograd	3	2	0	1	6	3	+3	6	
7	D	(Denmark) Gentofte	3	2	0	1	12	11	+1	6	
8	C	(Luxembourg) Differdange 03	3	1	0	2	9	10	−1	3	

Updated to match(es) played on 24 August 2021. Source: Unknown
Rules for classification: Tiebreakers

== Main round ==
The draw for the main round was held on 30 August 2021, 14:00 CEST. The main round was played from 26 to 31 October 2021.

=== Seeding ===
A total of 32 teams played in the main round. They were divided in two paths:

- Path A (16 teams): the title holders and teams ranked 1–11 and 16–19.
- Path B (16 teams): teams ranked 12–15 and 20-22 and 9 teams advancing form the preliminary round.

Seeding of teams was based on their 2021 UEFA futsal club coefficients. On Path B, the seeding position 3 and 4 were drawn from the same pot, comprising all teams advancing from the preliminary round, with the exception of Luxol St Andrews, who attributed to seeding position 2 as top ranked team advancing from the previous round. Eight teams (four in each path) were pre-selected as hosts and were first drawn from a separate pot to their corresponding seeding position. The remaining teams were then drawn from their respective pots to their corresponding seeding position. Teams from Kosovo and Serbia, Kosovo and Bosnia and Herzegovina or Armenia and Azerbaijan could not be drawn into the same group. Additionally, winners and runners-up from the same preliminary round advancing to the main round could not be drawn into the same group.

Path A
Seeding position 1	Seeding position 2	Seeding position 3	Seeding position 4
(Portugal) Sporting CP; (Spain) Barcelona; (Kazakhstan) Kairat; (Portugal) Benfica	(Spain) Levante; (Russia) MFK Tyumen; (Slovenia) Dobovec (H); (Russia) Sinara Ekaterinburg	(Kazakhstan) Atyrau; (Lithuania) Kauno Žalgiris (H); (Italy) Pesaro (H); (Belgium) Halle-Gooik	(France) ACCS; (Czech Republic) Plzeň; (Slovakia) MIMEL Lučenec (H); (Belarus) Viten Orsha

Path B
Seeding position 1	Seeding position 2	Seeding position 3 and 4	
(Croatia) Olmissum (H); (Bosnia and Herzegovina) Mostar (H); (Poland) Rekord Bielsko-Biała; (Romania) Csíkszereda	(Armenia) Leo; (Ukraine) Uragan (H); (Malta) Luxol St Andrews (H); (Netherlands) Hovocubo	(Azerbaijan) Araz Naxçivan; (Hungary) Haladás; (Serbia) FON; (Finland) Kampuksen Dynamo	(Kosovo) Liqeni; (Moldova) Dinamo Plus; (Sweden) Hammarby IF; (Austria) Diamant Linz

Notes

- H – Mini-tournament hosts

=== Path A ===
The top three teams of each group in Path A advanced to the elite round.

==== Group 1 ====
Pos	Team	Pld	W	D	L	GF	GA	GD	Pts	Qualification
1	(Portugal) Benfica	3	3	0	0	17	3	+14	9	Elite round
2	(Russia) Sinara Yekaterinburg	3	2	0	1	5	5	0	6	Elite round
3	(Belgium) Halle-Gooik	3	1	0	2	8	4	+4	3	Elite round
4	(Slovakia) Lučenec (H)	3	0	0	3	2	20	−18	0	

Source: UEFA
Rules for classification: Qualifying tiebreakers
(H) Hosts
27 October 2021
10:30

Benfica (Portugal)	2–1	(Belgium) Halle-Gooik
	Report

Športová hala Arena, Lučenec
Attendance: 298
Referee: Grigori Ošomkov (EST), Trayan Enchev (BUL), Norbert Szilágyi (HUN)
27 October 2021
13:00

Sinara Yekaterinburg (Russia)	3–0	(Slovakia) Lučenec
	Report

Športová hala Arena, Lučenec
Attendance: 600
Referee: Nicola Manzione (ITA), Norbert Szilágyi (HUN), Trayan Enchev (BUL)

28 October 2021
10:30

Sinara Yekaterinburg (Russia)	1–5	(Portugal) Benfica
	Report

Športová hala Arena, Lučenec
Attendance: 180
Referee: Trayan Enchev (BUL), Nicola Manzione (ITA), Grigori Ošomkov (EST)
28 October 2021
13:00

Lučenec (Slovakia)	1–7	(Belgium) Halle-Gooik
	Report

Športová hala Arena, Lučenec
Attendance: 550
Referee: Norbert Szilágyi (HUN), Grigori Ošomkov (EST), Nicola Manzione (ITA)

30 October 2021
09:30

Halle-Gooik (Belgium)	0–1	(Russia) Sinara Yekaterinburg
	Report

Športová hala Arena, Lučenec
Attendance: 420
Referee: Nicola Manzione (ITA), Grigori Ošomkov (EST), Norbert Szilágyi (HUN)
30 October 2021
12:00

Lučenec (Slovakia)	1–10	(Portugal) Benfica
	Report

Športová hala Arena, Lučenec
Attendance: 680
Referee: Trayan Enchev (BUL), Norbert Szilágyi (HUN), Grigori Ošomkov (EST)

==== Group 2 ====
Pos	Team	Pld	W	D	L	GF	GA	GD	Pts	Qualification
1	(Portugal) Sporting CP	3	3	0	0	18	5	+13	9	Elite round
2	(France) ACCS	3	2	0	1	14	8	+6	6	Elite round
3	(Slovenia) Dobovec (H)	3	1	0	2	7	12	−5	3	Elite round
4	(Kazakhstan) Atyrau	3	0	0	3	2	16	−14	0	

Source: UEFA
Rules for classification: Qualifying tiebreakers
(H) Hosts
27 October 2021
12:30

Sporting CP (Portugal)	4–3	(France) ACCS
	Report

Sport Hall Podčetrtek, Podčetrtek
Attendance: 100
Referee: Juan Boelen (BEL), Iurii Neverov (RUS), Besar Beqiri (KOS)
27 October 2021
15:00

Atyrau (Kazakhstan)	1–2	(Slovenia) Dobovec
	Report

Sport Hall Podčetrtek, Podčetrtek
Attendance: 400
Referee: Ingus Puriņš (LVA), Iurii Neverov (RUS), Besar Beqiri (KOS)

28 October 2021
12:30

Atyrau (Kazakhstan)	1–8	(Portugal) Sporting CP
	Report

Sport Hall Podčetrtek, Podčetrtek
Attendance: 150
Referee: Besar Beqiri (KOS), Juan Boelen (BEL), Ingus Puriņš (LVA)
28 October 2021
15:00

Dobovec (Slovenia)	4–5	(France) ACCS
	Report

Sport Hall Podčetrtek, Podčetrtek
Attendance: 400
Referee: Iurii Neverov (RUS), Ingus Puriņš (LVA), Juan Boelen (BEL)

30 October 2021
12:30

ACCS (France)	6–0	(Kazakhstan) Atyrau
	Report

Sport Hall Podčetrtek, Podčetrtek
Attendance: 130
Referee: Juan Boelen (BEL), Besar Beqiri (KOS), Ingus Puriņš (LVA)
30 October 2021
15:00

Dobovec (Slovenia)	1–6	(Portugal) Sporting CP
	Report

Sport Hall Podčetrtek, Podčetrtek
Attendance: 450
Referee: Iurii Neverov (RUS), Ingus Puriņš (LVA), Besar Beqiri (KOS)

==== Group 3 ====
Pos	Team	Pld	W	D	L	GF	GA	GD	Pts	Qualification
1	(Spain) Barcelona	3	3	0	0	21	4	+17	9	Elite round
2	(Spain) Levante	3	1	1	1	8	12	−4	4	Elite round
3	(Belarus) Viten Orsha	3	0	2	1	6	10	−4	2	Elite round
4	(Lithuania) Kauno Žalgiris (H)	3	0	1	2	5	14	−9	1	

Source: UEFA
Rules for classification: Qualifying tiebreakers
(H) Hosts
26 October 2021
10:30

Barcelona (Spain)	5–1	(Belarus) Viten Orsha
	Report

Žalgiris Arena, Kaunas
Attendance: 100
Referee: Vedran Babić (CRO), Aleš Močnik Perič (SVN), Yaroslav Vovchok (UKR)
26 October 2021
13:00

Levante (Spain)	4–1	(Lithuania) Kauno Žalgiris
	Report

Žalgiris Arena, Kaunas
Attendance: 250
Referee: Tomasz Frąk (POL), Yaroslav Vovchok (UKR), Aleš Močnik Perič (SVN)

27 October 2021
10:30

Levante (Spain)	2–9	(Spain) Barcelona
	Report

Žalgiris Arena, Kaunas
Attendance: 100
Referee: Yaroslav Vovchok (UKR), Vedran Babić (CRO), Tomasz Frąk (POL)
27 October 2021
13:00

Kauno Žalgiris (Lithuania)	3–3	(Belarus) Viten Orsha
	Report

Žalgiris Arena, Kaunas
Attendance: 260
Referee: Aleš Močnik Perič (SVN), Tomasz Frąk (POL), Vedran Babić (CRO)

29 October 2021
10:30

Viten Orsha (Belarus)	2–2	(Spain) Levante
	Report

Žalgiris Arena, Kaunas
Attendance: 100
Referee: Tomasz Frąk (POL), Yaroslav Vovchok (UKR), Aleš Močnik Perič (SVN)
29 October 2021
13:00

Kauno Žalgiris (Lithuania)	1–7	(Spain) Barcelona
	Report

Žalgiris Arena, Kaunas
Attendance: 800
Referee: Vedran Babić (CRO), Aleš Močnik Perič (SVN), Yaroslav Vovchok (UKR)

==== Group 4 ====
Pos	Team	Pld	W	D	L	GF	GA	GD	Pts	Qualification
1	(Kazakhstan) Kairat	3	1	2	0	9	8	+1	5	Elite round
2	(Czech Republic) Plzeň	3	1	1	1	6	7	−1	4	Elite round
3	(Russia) Tyumen	3	1	1	1	6	6	0	4	Elite round
4	(Italy) Pesaro (H)	3	1	0	2	8	8	0	3	

Source: UEFA
Rules for classification: Qualifying tiebreakers
(H) Hosts
27 October 2021
12:30

Kairat (Kazakhstan)	3–3	(Czech Republic) Plzeň
	Report

RDS Stadium, Rimini
Attendance: 60
Referee: Vasilios Christodoulis (GRE), Vlad Nicolae Ciobanu (ROU), Murat Çolak (TUR)
27 October 2021
15:30

Tyumen (Russia)	3–2	(Italy) Pesaro
	Report

RDS Stadium, Rimini
Attendance: 230
Referee: Javier Moreno (ESP), Murat Çolak (TUR), Vlad Nicolae Ciobanu (ROU)

28 October 2021
12:30

Tyumen (Russia)	3–3	(Kazakhstan) Kairat
	Report

RDS Stadium, Rimini
Attendance: 50
Referee: Murat Çolak (TUR), Vasilios Christodoulis (GRE), Javier Moreno (ESP)
28 October 2021
15:30

Pesaro (Italy)	4–2	(Czech Republic) Plzeň
	Report

RDS Stadium, Rimini
Attendance: 165
Referee: Vlad Nicolae Ciobanu (ROU), Javier Moreno (ESP), Vasilios Christodoulis (GRE)

30 October 2021
10:00

Plzeň (Czech Republic)	1–0	(Russia) Tyumen
	Report

RDS Stadium, Rimini
Attendance: 107
Referee: Vlad Nicolae Ciobanu (ROU), Vasilios Christodoulis (GRE), Murat Çolak (TUR)
30 October 2021
13:00

Pesaro (Italy)	2–3	(Kazakhstan) Kairat
	Report

RDS Stadium, Rimini
Attendance: 350
Referee: Javier Moreno (ESP), Murat Çolak (TUR), Vasilios Christodoulis (GRE)

=== Path B ===
The winners of each group in Path B advanced to the elite round.

==== Group 5 ====
Pos	Team	Pld	W	D	L	GF	GA	GD	Pts	Qualification
1	(Hungary) Haladás	3	3	0	0	16	9	+7	9	Elite round
2	(Poland) Rekord Bielsko-Biała	3	1	1	1	11	7	+4	4	
3	(Malta) Luxol St Andrews (H)	3	1	1	1	6	9	−3	4	
4	(Sweden) Hammarby	3	0	0	3	8	16	−8	0	

Source: UEFA
Rules for classification: Qualifying tiebreakers
(H) Hosts
27 October 2021
12:00

Rekord Bielsko-Biała (Poland)	7–2	(Sweden) Hammarby
	Report

Tal-Qroqq University Sports Hall, Gżira
Attendance: 30
Referee: Jan Kresta (CZE), David Schaerli (SUI), Carl Hughes (WAL)
27 October 2021
15:00

Haladás (Hungary)	6–2	(Malta) Luxol St Andrews
	Report

Tal-Qroqq University Sports Hall, Gżira
Attendance: 80
Referee: Grigori Zelentsov (RUS), Carl Hughes (WAL), David Schaerli (SUI)

28 October 2021
12:00

Haladás (Hungary)	4–3	(Poland) Rekord Bielsko-Biała
	Report

Tal-Qroqq University Sports Hall, Gżira
Attendance: 65
Referee: Carl Hughes (WAL), Jan Kresta (CZE), Grigori Zelentsov (RUS)
28 October 2021
15:00

Luxol St Andrews (Malta)	3–2	(Sweden) Hammarby
	Report

Tal-Qroqq University Sports Hall, Gżira
Attendance: 70
Referee: David Schaerli (SUI), Grigori Zelentsov (RUS), Jan Kresta (CZE)

30 October 2021
12:00

Hammarby (Sweden)	4–6	(Hungary) Haladás
	Report

Tal-Qroqq University Sports Hall, Gżira
Attendance: 20
Referee: David Schaerli (SUI), Carl Hughes (WAL), Jan Kresta (CZE)
30 October 2021
15:00

Luxol St Andrews (Malta)	1–1	(Poland) Rekord Bielsko-Biała
	Report

Tal-Qroqq University Sports Hall, Gżira
Attendance: 80
Referee: Grigori Zelentsov (RUS), Jan Kresta (CZE), Carl Hughes (WAL)

==== Group 6 ====
Pos	Team	Pld	W	D	L	GF	GA	GD	Pts	Qualification
1	(Ukraine) Uragan (H)	3	3	0	0	11	2	+9	9	Elite round
2	(Azerbaijan) Araz Naxçivan	3	1	1	1	12	11	+1	4	
3	(Kosovo) Liqeni	3	1	1	1	13	17	−4	4	
4	(Romania) United Galati	3	0	0	3	7	13	−6	0	

Source: UEFA
Rules for classification: Qualifying tiebreakers
(H) Hosts
28 October 2021
08:00

United Galati (Romania)	4–6	(Kosovo) Liqeni
	Report

Hall IF College of PE, Ivano-Frankivsk
Attendance: 50
Referee: Ozan Soykan (TUR), Cristiano Cardoso (POR), Dejan Veselič (SVN)
28 October 2021
13:00

Uragan (Ukraine)	2–1	(Azerbaijan) Araz Naxçivan
	Report

Hall IF College of PE, Ivano-Frankivsk
Attendance: 250
Referee: Josip Barton (MKD), Dejan Veselič (SVN), Cristiano Cardoso (POR)

29 October 2021
08:00

Araz Naxçivan (Azerbaijan)	5–3	(Romania) United Galati
	Report

Hall IF College of PE, Ivano-Frankivsk
Attendance: 50
Referee: Dejan Veselič (SVN), Ozan Soykan (TUR), Josip Barton (MKD)
29 October 2021
13:00

Uragan (Ukraine)	7–1	(Kosovo) Liqeni
	Report

Hall IF College of PE, Ivano-Frankivsk
Attendance: 400
Referee: Cristiano Cardoso (POR), Josip Barton (MKD), Ozan Soykan (TUR)

31 October 2021
09:00

Liqeni (Kosovo)	6–6	(Azerbaijan) Araz Naxçivan
	Report

Hall IF College of PE, Ivano-Frankivsk
Attendance: 50
Referee: Cristiano Cardoso (POR), Josip Barton (MKD), Ozan Soykan (TUR)
31 October 2021
14:00

Uragan (Ukraine)	2–0	(Romania) United Galati
	Report

Hall IF College of PE, Ivano-Frankivsk
Attendance: 300
Referee: Dejan Veselič (SVN), Ozan Soykan (TUR), Josip Barton (MKD)

==== Group 7 ====
Pos	Team	Pld	W	D	L	GF	GA	GD	Pts	Qualification
1	(Croatia) Olmissum (H)	3	3	0	0	14	1	+13	9	Elite round
2	(Serbia) FON	3	1	0	2	12	7	+5	3	
3	(Armenia) Leo	3	1	0	2	7	12	−5	3	
4	(Austria) Diamant Linz	3	1	0	2	6	19	−13	3	

Source: UEFA
Rules for classification: Qualifying tiebreakers
(H) Hosts
27 October 2021
10:00

Leo (Armenia)	4–5	(Austria) Diamant Linz
	Report

Sportska dvorana Ribnjak, Omiš
Attendance: 50
Referee: Julien Lang (FRA), Viktor Bugenko (MDA), Antonios Adamopoulos (GRE)
27 October 2021
15:00

Olmissum (Croatia)	3–1	(Serbia) FON
	Report

Sportska dvorana Ribnjak, Omiš
Attendance: 600
Referee: Ibrahim El Jilali (NED), Antonios Adamopoulos (GRE), Viktor Bugenko (MDA)

28 October 2021
10:00

FON (Serbia)	2–3	(Armenia) Leo
	Report

Sportska dvorana Ribnjak, Omiš
Attendance: 20
Referee: Antonios Adamopoulos (GRE), Julien Lang (FRA), Ibrahim El Jilali (NED)
28 October 2021
15:00

Olmissum (Croatia)	6–0	(Austria) Diamant Linz
	Report

Sportska dvorana Ribnjak, Omiš
Attendance: 500
Referee: Viktor Bugenko (MDA), Ibrahim El Jilali (NED), Julien Lang (FRA)

30 October 2021
10:00

Diamant Linz (Austria)	1–9	(Serbia) FON
	Report

Sportska dvorana Ribnjak, Omiš
Attendance: 20
Referee: Antonios Adamopoulos (GRE), Viktor Bugenko (MDA), Julien Lang (FRA)
30 October 2021
15:00

Olmissum (Croatia)	5–0	(Armenia) Leo
	Report

Sportska dvorana Ribnjak, Omiš
Attendance: 650
Referee: Ibrahim El Jilali (NED), Julien Lang (FRA), Viktor Bugenko (MDA)

==== Group 8 ====
Pos	Team	Pld	W	D	L	GF	GA	GD	Pts	Qualification
1	(Netherlands) Hovocubo	3	2	1	0	11	3	+8	7	Elite round
2	(Finland) Kampuksen Dynamo	3	1	2	0	12	4	+8	5	
3	(Bosnia and Herzegovina) Mostar (H)	3	1	1	1	11	8	+3	4	
4	(Moldova) Dinamo Plus	3	0	0	3	4	23	−19	0	

Source: UEFA
Rules for classification: Qualifying tiebreakers
(H) Hosts
27 October 2021
11:30

Hovocubo (Netherlands)	5–0	(Moldova) Dinamo Plus
	Report

JP Sportski centar Jablanica, Jablanica
Attendance: 186
Referee: Peter Nurse (ENG), Eduards Fatkuļins (LVA), Maksim Dzeikala (BLR)
27 October 2021
15:00

Mostar (Bosnia and Herzegovina)	1–1	(Finland) Kampuksen Dynamo
	Report

JP Sportski centar Jablanica, Jablanica
Attendance: 573
Referee: Marjan Mladenovski (MKD), Maksim Dzeikala (BLR), Eduards Fatkuļins (LVA)

28 October 2021
11:30

Kampuksen Dynamo (Finland)	2–2	(Netherlands) Hovocubo
	Report

JP Sportski centar Jablanica, Jablanica
Attendance: 73
Referee: Maksim Dzeikala (BLR), Peter Nurse (ENG), Marjan Mladenovski (MKD)
28 October 2021
15:00

Mostar (Bosnia and Herzegovina)	9–3	(Moldova) Dinamo Plus
	Report

JP Sportski centar Jablanica, Jablanica
Attendance: 668
Referee: Eduards Fatkuļins (LVA), Marjan Mladenovski (MKD), Peter Nurse (ENG)

30 October 2021
11:30

Dinamo Plus (Moldova)	1–9	(Finland) Kampuksen Dynamo
	Report

JP Sportski centar Jablanica, Jablanica
Attendance: 65
Referee: Eduards Fatkuļins (LVA), Marjan Mladenovski (MKD), Maksim Dzeikala (BLR)
30 October 2021
15:00

Mostar (Bosnia and Herzegovina)	1–4	(Netherlands) Hovocubo
	Report

JP Sportski centar Jablanica, Jablanica
Attendance: 683
Referee: Peter Nurse (ENG), Maksim Dzeikala (BLR), Marjan Mladenovski (MKD)

== Elite round ==
The draw for the elite round was held on 3 November 2021, 14:00 CET. The elite round was played from 30 November to 5 December 2021.

=== Seeding ===
A total of 16 teams played in the elite round. Seeding of teams was based on their results in the previous round:

- Seeding position 1: main round path A group winners.
- Seeding position 2: main round path A runners-up.
- Seeding positions 3 and 4 (drawn from the same pot): main round path A third-placed teams and path B group winners.

Four teams were pre-selected as hosts and were first drawn from a separate pot to their corresponding seeding position. Teams from Ukraine and Russia could not be drawn into the same group. Additionally, winners and runners-up from the same main round path A group could not be drawn into the same group.

Seeding position 1	Seeding position 2	Seeding positions 3 and 4	
(Portugal) Benfica (H); (Portugal) Sporting CP (H); (Spain) Barcelona; (Kazakhstan) Kairat	(Russia) Sinara Ekaterinburg; (France) ACCS; (Spain) Levante; (Czech Republic) Plzeň (H)	(Belgium) Halle-Gooik; (Slovenia) Dobovec; (Belarus) Viten Orsha; (Russia) Tyumen (H)	(Hungary) Haladás; (Ukraine) Uragan; (Croatia) Olmissum; (Netherlands) Hovocubo

Notes

- H – Mini-tournament hosts

=== Group A ===
Pos	Team	Pld	W	D	L	GF	GA	GD	Pts	Qualification
1	(Russia) Tyumen (H)	3	3	0	0	11	6	+5	9	Excluded
2	(France) ACCS	3	1	1	1	15	13	+2	4	Advance to final tournament
3	(Kazakhstan) Kairat	3	1	1	1	8	8	0	4	
4	(Belarus) Viten Orsha	3	0	0	3	9	16	−7	0	

Source: UEFA
Rules for classification: Tiebreakers
(H) Hosts
2 December 2021
08:00

Kairat (Kazakhstan)	3–2	(Belarus) Viten Orsha
	Report

Sports Complex Centralny, Tyumen
Attendance: 1,000
Referee: Chiara Perona (ITA), Nicola Maria Manzione (ITA), Alejandro Martínez (ESP)
2 December 2021
11:00

ACCS (France)	2–5	(Russia) Tyumen
	Report

Sports Complex Centralny, Tyumen
Attendance: 1,400
Referee: Juan José Cordero (ESP), Alejandro Martínez (ESP), Nicola Maria Manzione (ITA)

3 December 2021
08:00

ACCS (France)	3–3	(Kazakhstan) Kairat
	Report

Sports Complex Centralny, Tyumen
Attendance: 800
Referee: Alejandro Martínez (ESP), Juan José Cordero (ESP), Chiara Perona (ITA)
3 December 2021
11:00

Tyumen (Russia)	3–2	(Belarus) Viten Orsha
	Report

Sports Complex Centralny, Tyumen
Attendance: 1,100
Referee: Nicola Maria Manzione (ITA), Chiara Perona (ITA), Juan José Cordero (ESP)

5 December 2021
08:00

Viten Orsha (Belarus)	5–10	(France) ACCS
	Report

Sports Complex Centralny, Tyumen
Attendance: 1,000
Referee: Nicola Maria Manzione (ITA), Chiara Perona (ITA), Alejandro Martínez (ESP)
5 December 2021
11:00

Tyumen (Russia)	3–2	(Kazakhstan) Kairat
	Report

Sports Complex Centralny, Tyumen
Attendance: 1,500
Referee: Juan José Cordero (ESP), Alejandro Martínez (ESP), Chiara Perona (ITA)

=== Group B ===
Pos	Team	Pld	W	D	L	GF	GA	GD	Pts	Qualification
1	(Portugal) Sporting CP (H)	3	2	1	0	12	4	+8	7	Advance to final tournament
2	(Russia) Sinara Ekaterinburg	3	2	1	0	9	4	+5	7	
3	(Croatia) Olmissum	3	1	0	2	7	9	−2	3	
4	(Netherlands) Hovocubo	3	0	0	3	6	17	−11	0	

Source: UEFA
Rules for classification: Tiebreakers
(H) Hosts
2 December 2021
17:30

Sinara Ekaterinburg (Russia)	5–1	(Netherlands) Hovocubo
	Report

Pavilhão João Rocha, Lisbon
Attendance: 65
Referee: Marc Birkett (ENG), Stefan Vrijens (BEL), David Grøndal Nissen (DEN)
2 December 2021
20:00

Olmissum (Croatia)	1–3	(Portugal) Sporting CP
	Report

Pavilhão João Rocha, Lisbon
Attendance: 435
Referee: Gábor Kovács (HUN), David Grøndal Nissen (DEN), Stefan Vrijens (BEL)

3 December 2021
16:30

Olmissum (Croatia)	2–3	(Russia) Sinara Ekaterinburg
	Report

Pavilhão João Rocha, Lisbon
Attendance: 49
Referee: David Grøndal Nissen (DEN), Marc Birkett (ENG), Gábor Kovács (HUN)
3 December 2021
19:00

Sporting CP (Portugal)	8–2	(Netherlands) Hovocubo
	Report

Pavilhão João Rocha, Lisbon
Attendance: 359
Referee: Stefan Vrijens (BEL), Gábor Kovács (HUN), Marc Birkett (ENG)

5 December 2021
17:30

Hovocubo (Netherlands)	3–4	(Croatia) Olmissum
	Report

Pavilhão João Rocha, Lisbon
Attendance: 54
Referee: Stefan Vrijens (BEL), David Grøndal Nissen (DEN), Marc Birkett (ENG)
5 December 2021
20:00

Sporting CP (Portugal)	1–1	(Russia) Sinara Ekaterinburg
	Report

Pavilhão João Rocha, Lisbon
Attendance: 619
Referee: Gábor Kovács (HUN), Marc Birkett (ENG), David Grøndal Nissen (DEN)

=== Group C ===
Pos	Team	Pld	W	D	L	GF	GA	GD	Pts	Qualification
1	(Spain) Barcelona	3	3	0	0	19	7	+12	9	Advance to final tournament
2	(Czech Republic) Plzeň (H)	3	1	0	2	9	9	0	3	
3	(Belgium) Halle-Gooik	3	1	0	2	11	15	−4	3	
4	(Slovenia) Dobovec	3	1	0	2	6	14	−8	3	

Source: UEFA
Rules for classification: Tiebreakers
(H) Hosts
1 December 2021
13:30

Barcelona (Spain)	8–2	(Slovenia) Dobovec
	Report

TJ Lokomotiva Plzeň, Plzeň
Attendance: 520
Referee: Nikola Jelić (CRO), Vedran Babić (CRO), Vladimir Kadykov (RUS)
1 December 2021
16:30

Halle-Gooik (Belgium)	3–6	(Czech Republic) Plzeň
	Report

TJ Lokomotiva Plzeň, Plzeň
Attendance: 623
Referee: Irina Velikanova (RUS), Vladimir Kadykov (RUS), Vedran Babić (CRO)

2 December 2021
13:30

Halle-Gooik (Belgium)	4–8	(Spain) Barcelona
	Report

TJ Lokomotiva Plzeň, Plzeň
Attendance: 580
Referee: Vedran Babić (CRO), Nikola Jelić (CRO), Irina Velikanova (RUS)
2 December 2021
16:30

Plzeň (Czech Republic)	2–3	(Slovenia) Dobovec
	Report

TJ Lokomotiva Plzeň, Plzeň
Attendance: 725
Referee: Vladimir Kadykov (RUS), Irina Velikanova (RUS), Nikola Jelić (CRO)

4 December 2021
11:00

Dobovec (Slovenia)	1–4	(Belgium) Halle-Gooik
	Report

TJ Lokomotiva Plzeň, Plzeň
Attendance: 420
Referee: Vladimir Kadykov (RUS), Irina Velikanova (RUS), Vedran Babić (CRO)
4 December 2021
14:00

Plzeň (Czech Republic)	1–3	(Spain) Barcelona
	Report

TJ Lokomotiva Plzeň, Plzeň
Attendance: 1,000
Referee: Nikola Jelić (CRO), Vedran Babić (CRO), Irina Velikanova (RUS)

=== Group D ===
Pos	Team	Pld	W	D	L	GF	GA	GD	Pts	Qualification
1	(Portugal) Benfica (H)	3	3	0	0	15	5	+10	9	Advance to final tournament
2	(Hungary) Haladás	3	1	0	2	9	11	−2	3	
3	(Spain) Levante	3	1	0	2	8	10	−2	3	
4	(Ukraine) Uragan	3	1	0	2	5	11	−6	3	

Source: UEFA
Rules for classification: Tiebreakers
(H) Hosts
1 December 2021
14:00

Levante (Spain)	3–5	(Ukraine) Uragan
	Report

Pavilhão Fidelidade, Lisbon
Attendance: 54
Referee: Cédric Pelissier (FRA), Victor Berg-Audic (FRA), Ozan Soykan (TUR)
1 December 2021
17:00

Haladás (Hungary)	3–8	(Portugal) Benfica
	Report

Pavilhão Fidelidade, Lisbon
Attendance: 309
Referee: Kamil Çetin (TUR), Ozan Soykan (TUR), Victor Berg-Audic (FRA)

2 December 2021
14:30

Haladás (Hungary)	2–3	(Spain) Levante
	Report

Pavilhão Fidelidade, Lisbon
Attendance: 50
Referee: Victor Berg-Audic (FRA), Cédric Pelissier (FRA), Kamil Çetin (TUR)
2 December 2021
17:30

Benfica (Portugal)	4–0	(Ukraine) Uragan
	Report

Pavilhão Fidelidade, Lisbon
Attendance: 327
Referee: Ozan Soykan (TUR), Kamil Çetin (TUR), Cédric Pelissier (FRA)

4 December 2021
14:00

Uragan (Ukraine)	0–4	(Hungary) Haladás
	Report

Pavilhão Fidelidade, Lisbon
Attendance: 83
Referee: Kamil Çetin (TUR), Ozan Soykan (TUR), Victor Berg-Audic (FRA)
4 December 2021
17:00

Benfica (Portugal)	3–2	(Spain) Levante
	Report

Pavilhão Fidelidade, Lisbon
Attendance: 577
Referee: Cédric Pelissier (FRA), Victor Berg-Audic (FRA), Kamil Çetin (TUR)

== Final tournament ==
The final tournament consisted of two semifinals, a third-place play-off and a final, and was contested by the last four remaining teams from 29 April to 1 May 2022 at Arena Riga in Latvia.

=== Bracket ===
Semi-finals
29 April
(Portugal) Benfica	4
(Spain) Barcelona (a.e.t.)	5
29 April
(France) ACCS	2
(Portugal) Sporting CP	6

Final
1 May
(Spain) Barcelona	4
(Portugal) Sporting CP	0
Third place
1 May
(France) ACCS	2
(Portugal) Benfica	5

=== Semi-finals ===
29 April 2022
18:00

ACCS (France)	2–6	(Portugal) Sporting CP
Lutin 17:38; Galmim 27:32	Report	Cejudo 4:04; Paçó 10:27; Merlim 11:32, 29:26; Cavinato 24:02; Cardinal 32:16 (pen.)

Arena Riga, Riga
Attendance: 1,891
Referee: Ondřej Černý (Czech Republic), Gábor Kovács (Hungary)
29 April 2022
21:00

Benfica (Portugal)	4–5 (a.e.t.)	(Spain) Barcelona
Tayyebi 0:41 (pen.); Rocha 8:57; Jesus 16:38; Chishkala 37:56	Report	Sousa 20:21 (o.g.); Ferrão 30:23; Dyego 34:08, 37:30; Adolfo 49:43

Arena Riga, Riga
Attendance: 4,319
Referee: Nicola Manzione (Italy), Chiara Perona (Italy)

=== Third place ===
1 May 2022
15:00

ACCS (France)	2–5	(Portugal) Benfica
Toure 32:10; Lutin 36:33	Report	Tayyebi 19:31; Rômulo 29:46; Ferreira 32:19; Jacaré 38:33; Henmi 39:16

Arena Riga, Riga
Attendance: 2,984
Referee: Ondřej Černý (Czech Republic), Nicola Manzione (Italy)

=== Final ===
1 May 2022
18:00

Barcelona (Spain)	4–0	(Portugal) Sporting CP
Lozano 15:19; Pito 18:35; Ferrão 20:27; Dídac Plana 38:19	Report

Arena Riga, Riga
Attendance: 8,442
Referee: Nikola Jelić (Croatia), Vedran Babić (Croatia)
