= 2011–12 Copa del Rey de Futsal =

2011–12 Copa del Rey
Tournament details
- Country: Spain
- Teams: 48

Final positions
- Champions: Barcelona Alusport
- Runners-up: ElPozo Murcia

Tournament statistics
- Matches played: 53
- Goals scored: 418 (7.89 per match)

The 2011–12 Copa del Rey was the 2nd staging of the Copa del Rey de Futsal. The competition began on October 8, 2011 and finished with the final on May 15, 2012. The final took place at Pabellón Fernando Argüelles in Antequera, Andalusia.

FC Barcelona Alusport won its second title in a row by defeating ElPozo Murcia 6–3 in the Final.

== Calendar ==
Round	Date	Fixtures	Clubs	Notes
First round	12 October 2011	6	12 → 32	Clubs participating in Segunda División B gain entry.
Second Round	1 November 2011	16	32 → 16	Clubs participating in Segunda División gain entry.
Third Round	5 & 6 December 2011	16	32 → 16	Clubs participating in Primera División gain entry.
Fourth Round	28 & 29 December 2011	8	16 → 8	
Quarter-finals	22 February 2012	4	8 → 4	
Semifinals	20 March 2012	2	4 → 2	
Semifinals	3 April 2012	2	4 → 2	
Final	May 15, 2012	1	2 → 1	

== Qualified teams ==
- 16 clubs of Primera División
- 14 clubs of Segunda División
- 24 clubs of Segunda División B

== First round ==
- Matches played on 12 October 2011.

Team 1	Result	Team 2
Famegonza	2 – 4	Aguas de Teror
O'Parrulo	6 – 2	Zamora
Azulejos y Pavimentos Brihuega	2 – 2	Guadalajara
Mutrayil-Mercomotril	Walkover	Albacete
Dominicos	4 – 1	Sícoris
Martín Fibrocementos	3 – 5	Auzoak Zierbena

== Second round ==
- Matches played on 1 November 2011.

Team 1	Result	Team 2
O'Parrulo	7 – 4	Cidade de Narón
Noia	2 – 3	Burela Pescados Rubén
Dominicos	2 – 2	UPV Maristas Valencia
Finques Centelles	3 – 3	Playas de Castellón
Bar Mi Casa	4 – 7	Space Gasifred Ciutat d'Ibiza
Zalatambor-Área 99	6 – 7	Hotels Plaza Andorra
Kirol Sport	4 – 9	Sala 5 Martorell
Auzoak Zierbena	6 – 5	L'Hospitalet Bellsport
Incosur-Coineña	4 – 7	Melilla
Mutrayil-Mercomotril	4 – 5	Unión Africa Ceutí
Uruguay-Peruanos	2 – 5	Gáldar Gran Canaria
Alamín	7 – 1	Aguas de Teror
Extremadura	4 – 5	Manzanares
Azulejos y Pavimentos Brihuega	3 – 1	Fuconsa Jaén
Leganés	4 – 4	Oxipharma
Pilaristas-Flex	5 – 4	UMA-Antequera

== Third round ==
- Matches played on 5 & 6 December 2011.

Team 1	Score	Team 2
Melilla	0 – 5	ElPozo Murcia
Unión Africa Ceutí	4 – 8	Carnicer Torrejón
Pilaristas-Flex	0 – 3	Caja Segovia
Space Gasifred Ciutat d'Ibiza	2 – 5	Fisiomedia Manacor
Gáldar Gran Canaria	5 – 3	OID Talavera
Alamín	1 – 3	Triman Navarra
Finques Centelles	3 – 4	FC Barcelona Alusport
Manzanares	4 – 1	Puertollano
Oxipharma	4 – 4	Reale Cartagena
Auzoak Zierbena	3 – 7	Ríos Renovables R. N.
Burela Pescados Rubén	5 – 5	A. Lobelle
UPV Maristas Valencia	3 – 3	Benicarló
Azulejos y Pavimentos Brihuega	2 – 6	Inter Movistar
O'Parrulo	5 – 7	Azkar Lugo
Sala 5 Martorell	1 – 5	Marfil Santa Coloma
Hotels Plaza Andorra	3 – 8	Umacon Zaragoza

== Fourth round ==
- Matches to be played on 28 December 2011 & 29 December 2011, and 11 January 2012.

Team 1	Score	Team 2
UPV Maristas Valencia	1 – 10	ElPozo Murcia
Marfil Santa Coloma	2 – 6	Fisiomedia Manacor
Ríos Renovables R. N.	5 – 3	Triman Navarra
Azkar Lugo	2 – 2	A. Lobelle
Manzanares	1 – 2	Caja Segovia
Oxipharma	3 – 3	Carnicer Torrejón
Umacon Zaragoza	1 – 2	FC Barcelona Alusport
Gáldar Gran Canaria	1 – 6	Inter Movistar

== Final phase bracket ==
Quarter-finals (21 & 22 February)
Ríos Renovables R.N.	1
A. Lobelle Santiago	2
Caja Segovia	1
ElPozo Murcia	6
Oxipharma	1
Inter Movistar	6
Fisiomedia Manacor	1 (4)
Barcelona Alusport	1 (5)

Semi-finals (20/21 March & 3 April)
A. Lobelle Santiago	2	1	3
ElPozo Murcia	4	6	10
Barcelona Alusport	3	3	6
Inter Movistar	1	2	3

Final (May 15)
ElPozo Murcia	3
Barcelona Alusport	6

=== Quarter finals ===
February 21, 2012	Ríos Renovables R.N.	1–2	A. Lobelle Santiago	Tudela
20:30 (UTC+1)	Cassio 25'	Report	10' Changuinha; 29' Aicardo	Stadium: Municipal Elola; Attendance: 800; Referee: Alonso Montesinos, Rubio Fajardo

February 21, 2012	Caja Segovia	1–6	ElPozo Murcia	Segovia
20:45 (UTC+1)	Borja Blanco 35'	Report	Kike 3', 37'; Gréllo 26', 29'; Álex 30'; Chico 38'	Stadium: Pedro Delgado; Attendance: 1,500; Referee: Gracia Marín, Munez Carpintero

February 21, 2012	Oxipharma	1–6	Inter Movistar	Albolote, Granada
21:00 (UTC+1)	Isco 2'	Report	Tobe 12', 38', 38'; Matías 18'; Eka 32'; Rafael 35'	Stadium: Municipal de Albolote; Attendance: 2,000; Referee: García Morón, Peña Gómez

February 22, 2012	Fisiomedia Manacor	2–2 (a.e.t.) (4–5 p)	Barcelona Alusport	Palma de Mallorca
20:30 (UTC+1)	Juan Carlos López 40'; Ari 2' (o.g.)	Report	18' Saad; 47' Fernandao	Stadium: Palma Arena; Attendance: 2,000; Referee: Fortes Pardo, Martínez Flores
	Penalties
	José Ruiz (penalty scored); Rubén (penalty scored); Amas (penalty scored); Paulinho (penalty scored); Illán (penalty missed)		(penalty scored) Javi Rodríguez; (penalty scored) Torras; (penalty scored) Wilde; (penalty scored) Lozano; (penalty scored) Saad

=== Semifinals ===
==== 1st leg ====
March 20, 2012	A. Lobelle Santiago	2–4	ElPozo Murcia	Santiago de Compostela
20:15 (UTC+1)	Luis 14', 34'	Report	Miguelín 2'; Esquerdinha 10', 37'; Bebe 38'	Stadium: Fontes do Sar; Attendance: 2,000; Referee: Contreras Tejedor, Pérez Álvarez

March 21, 2012	Barcelona Alusport	3–1	Inter Movistar	Barcelona
20:30 (UTC+1)	Wilde 23', 33'; Ortiz 37' (o.g.)	Report	Rafael 33'	Stadium: Palau Blaugrana; Attendance: 2,400; Referee: Fortes Pardo, Martínez Flores

==== 2nd leg ====
April 3, 2012	ElPozo Murcia	6–1 (10–3 agg.)	A. Lobelle Santiago	Murcia
19:15 (UTC+2)	Esquerdinha 5', 18'; Saúl 9', 23'; Miguelín 25'; Dani Salgado 28'	Report	Aicardo 3'	Stadium: Palacio de Deportes; Attendance: 4,200; Referee: Rabadán Sainz, Sánchez Ayala

April 3, 2012	Inter Movistar	2–3 (3–6 agg.)	Barcelona Alusport	Alcalá de Henares
21:00 (UTC+2)	Eka 10', 35'	Report	Ari 28'; Saad 38'; Lin 39'	Stadium: Pabellón Caja Madrid; Attendance: 4,550; Referee: Felipe Madorrán, Gereta Ramírez

=== Final ===
May 15, 2012	Barcelona Alusport	6–3	ElPozo Murcia	Antequera
20:00 (UTC+2)	Javi Rodríguez 12'; Saad 13'; Lin 16'; Gabriel 34'; Sergio Lozano 37'; Cristian 38'	Report	Esquerdinha 4'; Saúl 23'; Dani Salgado 36'	Stadium: Pabellón Fernando Argüelles; Attendance: 2,500; Referee: Moreno Reina, Ramos Marín

2011–12 Copa del Rey winners
(Catalonia)
Barcelona Alusport
Second title

== See also ==
- 2011–12 Primera División de Futsal
- 2012 Copa de España de Futsal
