= 2011 Copa de España de Futsal =

2011 Copa de España

Tournament details
- Country: Spain
- Teams: 8

Final positions
- Champions: Barcelona Alusport
- Runners-up: ElPozo Murcia

Tournament statistics
- Matches played: 7
- Goals scored: 46 (6.57 per match)

The 2011 Copa de España de Fútbol Sala is the 22nd staging of the Copa de España de Fútbol Sala. It was held in the Pabellón Pedro Delgado, in Segovia, Spain, between 3 February and 6 February 2011.

== Qualified teams ==
#	Club
1	Caja Segovia, host team
2	ElPozo Murcia
3	Xacobeo Lobelle
4	Barcelona Alusport
5	Inter Movistar
6	Fisiomedia Manacor
7	Triman Navarra
8	Benicarló Aeroport Castelló

== Final tournament ==
=== Knockout stage ===
Quarter-finals
3 February - Pedro Delgado
Barcelona Alusport	6
Fisiomedia Manacor	0
3 February - Pedro Delgado
Benicarló Aeroport Castelló	4
Caja Segovia	5
4 February - Pedro Delgado
Inter Movistar	5
Xacobeo Lobelle	6
4 February - Pedro Delgado
Triman Navarra	3 (3)
ElPozo Murcia	3 (5)

Semi-finals
5 February - Pedro Delgado
Barcelona Alusport	2 (5)
Caja Segovia	2 (4)
5 February - Pedro Delgado
Xacobeo Lobelle	2
ElPozo Murcia	3

Final
6 February - Pedro Delgado
Barcelona Alusport	3
ElPozo Murcia	2

==== Quarter-finals ====
3 February 2011	Barcelona Alusport	6–0	Fisiomedia Manacor	Segovia
19:00 (UTC+1)	Lin 8', 39'; Wilde 19', 32'; Saad 31'; Igor 40'	Report		Stadium: Pedro Delgado; Attendance: 3,000; Referee: Cordero Gallardo, Linares López

3 February 2011	Benicarló Aeroport Castelló	4–5 (a.e.t.)	Caja Segovia	Segovia
21:00 (UTC+1)	Vadillo 20'; Xapa 30'; Lolo 34'; Chaguinha 40'	Report	Geison 4', 37'; Sergio Lozano 26'; Borja 29'; Matías 45'	Stadium: Pedro Delgado; Attendance: 3,000; Referee: Blázquez Sierra, García Morón

4 February 2011	Inter Movistar	5–6	Xacobeo Lobelle	Segovia
19:00 (UTC+1)	Schumacher 5'; Ortiz 16'; Eka 29'; Gabriel 35'; Borja 37'	Report	Schumacher 3' (o.g.); Charlie 8'; Rafael 10'; Raúl Campos 11'; Aicardo 20'; David 39'	Stadium: Pedro Delgado; Attendance: 3,000; Referee: Peña Díaz, Peña Gómez

4 February 2011	Triman Navarra	3–3 (a.e.t.) (3–5 p)	ElPozo Murcia	Segovia
21:00 (UTC+1)	Javi Eseverri 21'; Rafa Usín 34'; Araça 40'	Report	Dani Salgado 7'; De Bail 8'; Kike 36'	Stadium: Pedro Delgado; Attendance: 3,000; Referee: Gutiérrez Lumbreras, Gracia Marín
	Penalties
	Jesulito (penalty scored); Uge (penalty scored); Carlitos (penalty scored); Parrel (penalty missed)		(penalty scored) Vinicius; (penalty scored) Álvaro; (penalty scored) De Bail; (penalty scored) Kike; (penalty scored) Mauricio

==== Semi-finals ====
5 February 2011	Barcelona Alusport	2–2 (a.e.t.) (5–4 p)	Caja Segovia	Segovia
18:00 (UTC+1)	Lin 22'; Fernandao 23'	Report	Sergio Lozano 27'; Antoñito 30'	Stadium: Pedro Delgado; Attendance: 3,000; Referee: Gracia Marín, Gutiérrez Lumbreras
	Penalties
	Javi Rodríguez (penalty scored); Torras (penalty missed); Saad (penalty scored); Wilde (penalty scored); Chico (penalty scored); Lin (penalty scored)		(penalty scored) Borja; (penalty scored) Sergio; (penalty scored) Matías; (penalty missed) Esquerdinha; (penalty scored) Sergio Lozano; (penalty missed) David

5 February 2011	Xacobeo Lobelle	2–3	ElPozo Murcia	Segovia
20:00 (UTC+1)	Aicardo 22'; Pola 35'	Report	Vinicius 10'; Kike 12'; Barroso 25'	Stadium: Pedro Delgado; Attendance: 3,000; Referee: Cordero Gallardo, Linares López

==== Final ====
6 February 2011	Barcelona Alusport	3–2	ElPozo Murcia	Segovia
19:00 (UTC+1)	Wilde 2', 12'; Chico 25'	Report	Álvaro 27'; Dani Salgado 40'	Stadium: Pedro Delgado; Attendance: 3,000; Referee: Peña Gómez, Peña Díaz

2011 Copa de España winners
(Catalonia)
Barcelona Alusport
First title

== See also ==
- 2010–11 División de Honor de Futsal
- 2010–11 Copa del Rey de Futsal
