= 2013 Copa de España de Futsal =

2013 Copa de España
Copa de España de Fútbol Sala Alcalá de Henares 2013

Tournament details
- Country: Spain
- Dates: 21 – 24 February
- Teams: 8

Final positions
- Champions: Barcelona Intersport
- Runners-up: ElPozo Murcia

Tournament statistics
- Matches played: 7
- Goals scored: 52 (7.43 per match)
- Attendance: 22,500 (3,214 per match)
- Top goal scorer: Fernandão 4

Awards
- Best player: Jordi Torras

The 2013 Copa de España de Fútbol Sala was the 24th staging of the Copa de España de Fútbol Sala. It took place in the Pabellón Caja Madrid for up to 4,500 seats, in Alcalá de Henares, Spain, between 21 and 24 February 2013. The tournament was hosted by LNFS and the Alcalá de Henares city council. Inter Movistar was the host team.

FC Barcelona Intersport won its third title in a row after defeating ElPozo Murcia 4–2 in the final.

== Qualified teams ==
The qualified teams were the eight first teams on standings at midseason.

#	Team	P	W	D	L	G+	G−	Dif	Pts
1	Barcelona Alusport	13	11	1	1	62	19	43	34
2	ElPozo Murcia	13	10	1	2	63	29	34	31
3	Inter Movistar	13	9	1	3	43	29	14	28
4	Lobelle Santiago	13	8	3	2	46	28	18	27
5	Caja Segovia	13	9	0	4	52	37	15	27
6	Triman Navarra	13	8	3	2	50	44	6	27
7	Ríos Renovables R.N.	13	6	1	6	46	47	−1	19
8	Umacon Zaragoza	13	6	1	6	41	42	−1	19

== Venue ==
Alcalá de Henares
Pabellón Caja Madrid
Capacity: 4,500
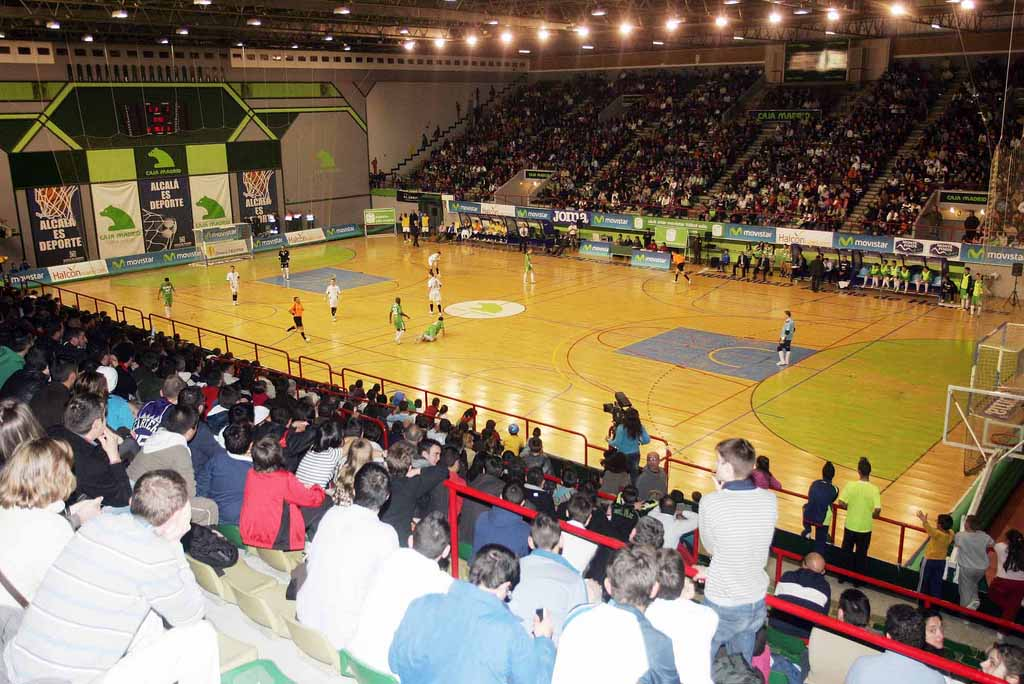

== Matches ==
Quarter-finals
1	FC Barcelona Alusport	7
8	Umacon Zaragoza	2
4	Santiago Futsal	5
7	Ríos Renovables R.N.	4
2	ElPozo Murcia	5
6	Triman Navarra	3
3	Inter Movistar	4 (3)
5	Caja Segovia	4 (4)

Semi-finals
1	FC Barcelona Alusport	5
4	Santiago Futsal	2
2	ElPozo Murcia	4
5	Caja Segovia	1

Final
1	FC Barcelona Alusport	4
2	ElPozo Murcia	2

=== Quarter-finals ===
February 21	Ríos Renovables R.N.	4–5	Santiago Futsal	Alcalá de Henares
19:00 (UTC+1)	David 9'; Charlie 16', 32'; Andresito 39'	Report	Bellvert 18'; Brandi 29'; Campos 35', 39'; Pazos 39'	Stadium: Pabellón Caja Madrid; Attendance: 4,500; Referee: Blázquez Sierra, García Morón

February 21	Umacon Zaragoza	2–7	FC Barcelona Alusport	Alcalá de Henares
21:15 (UTC+1)	Chico 37'; Miguel 38'	Report	Wilde 17', 39'; Fernandão 24'; Aicardo 25', 35'; Sergio Lozano 29', 39'	Stadium: Pabellón Caja Madrid; Attendance: 4,500; Referee: Cordero Gallardo, Linares López

February 22	Triman Navarra	3–5	ElPozo Murcia	Alcalá de Henares
19:00 (UTC+1)	V. Arévalo 15'; Rafa Usín 35'; Jesulito 38'	Report	Kike 18'; Adri 24'; Bebe 28', 38'; Gréllo 37'	Stadium: Pabellón Caja Madrid; Attendance: 4,500; Referee: Gutiérrez Lumbreras, Lope Díaz

February 22	Inter Movistar	4–4 (a.e.t.) (3–4 p)	Caja Segovia	Alcalá de Henares
21:15 (UTC+1)	Gadeia 5'; Rafael 18', 23'; Bateria 29', 35' (o.g.)	Report	Sergio 5'; Palomeque 15'; José Carlos 19'	Stadium: Pabellón Caja Madrid; Attendance: 4,500; Referee: Martínez Flores, Sanzol Goñi
	Penalties
	Oitomeia (penalty scored); Rafael (penalty scored); Bateria (penalty missed); Álvaro (penalty scored); Gadeia (penalty missed)		(penalty scored) Sergio; (penalty scored) David; (penalty scored) Palomeque; (penalty scored) Borja

=== Semi-finals ===
February 23	Santiago Futsal	2–5	FC Barcelona Alusport	Alcalá de Henares
18:00 (UTC+1)	Quintela 16'; Brandi 39'	Report	Wilde 1'; Fernandão 5', 27'; Aicardo 8'; Lin 21'	Stadium: Pabellón Caja Madrid; Attendance: 4,500; Referee: Martínez Flores, Sanzol Goñi

February 23	ElPozo Murcia	4–1	Caja Segovia	Alcalá de Henares
20:15 (UTC+1)	Franklin 2', 34'; Gréllo 33', 39'	Report	David 14'	Stadium: Pabellón Caja Madrid; Attendance: 4,500; Referee: Blázquez Sierra, García Morón

=== Final ===
February 24	FC Barcelona Alusport	4–2	ElPozo Murcia	Alcalá de Henares
20:45 (UTC+1)	Jordi Torras 16', 19', 32'; Fernandão 26'	Report	Bebe 9'; Álex 35'	Stadium: Pabellón Caja Madrid; Attendance: 4,500; Referee: Gutiérrez Lumbreras, Lope Díaz

2013 Copa de España winners
(Catalonia)
Barcelona Alusport
Third title

== Top 5 goalscorers ==
Rank	Name	Team	Goals
1	Fernandão	FC Barcelona Alusport	4
2	Wilde	FC Barcelona Alusport	3
3	Aicardo	FC Barcelona Alusport	3
4	Gréllo	ElPozo Murcia	3
5	Jordi Torras	FC Barcelona Alusport	3

Source: own compilation

== See also ==
- 2012–13 Primera División de Futsal
- 2012–13 Copa del Rey de Futsal
