= 2012 Copa de España de Futsal =

2012 Copa de España
Copa de España de Fútbol Sala Logroño 2012

Tournament details
- Country: Spain
- Teams: 8

Final positions
- Champions: Barcelona Alusport
- Runners-up: Lobelle Santiago

Tournament statistics
- Matches played: 7
- Goals scored: 36 (5.14 per match)
- Attendance: 26,300 (3,757 per match)

The 2012 Copa de España de Fútbol Sala was the 23rd staging of the Copa de España de Fútbol Sala. It took place in the Palacio de los Deportes de La Rioja, in Logroño, Spain, between 8 and 11 March 2012. It was hosted by LNFS, La Rioja government & Logroño city council. There was no host team.

== Qualified teams ==
The qualified teams were the eight first teams on standings at midseason.

#	Team	P	W	D	L	G+	G−	Dif	Pts
1	Barcelona Intersport	15	12	3	0	78	25	53	39
2	ElPozo Murcia	15	12	3	0	75	42	33	39
3	Inter Movistar	15	9	3	3	57	29	28	30
4	Caja Segovia	15	8	4	3	46	30	16	28
5	Triman Navarra	15	7	2	6	38	45	-7	23
6	OID Talavera	15	7	2	6	45	54	-9	23
7	Lobelle Santiago	15	6	4	5	44	39	5	22
8	Carnicer Torrejón	15	6	3	6	60	52	8	21

== Venue ==
Logroño
Palacio de los Deportes de La Rioja
Capacity: 4,500
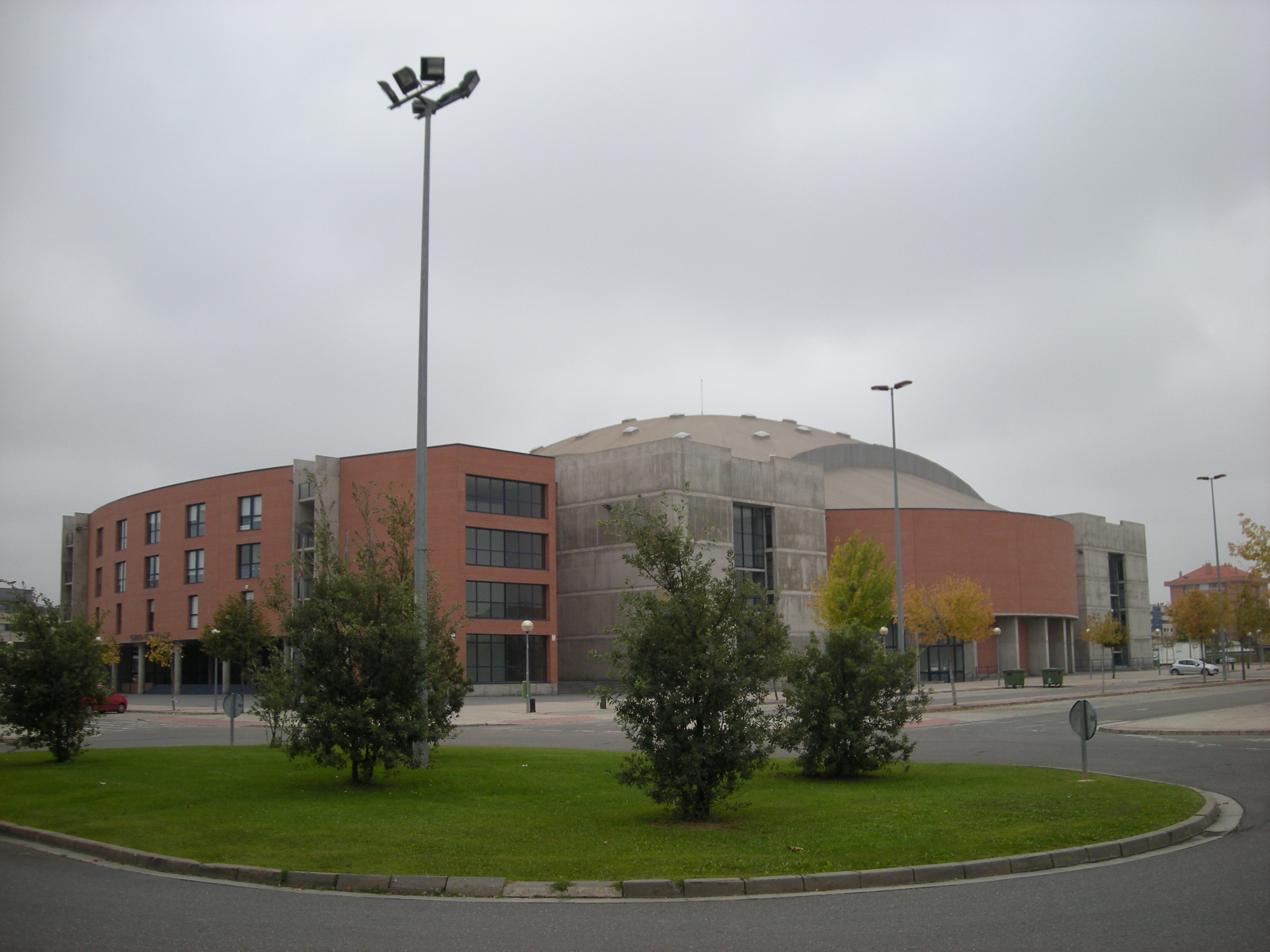

== Knockout stage ==
Quarter-finals
March 8 - Palacio de los Deportes
Caja Segovia	0
Barcelona Alusport	3
March 8 - Palacio de los Deportes
Inter Movistar	5
ElPozo Murcia	0
March 9 - Palacio de los Deportes
Carnicer Torrejón	2 (6)
A. Lobelle	2 (7)
March 9 - Palacio de los Deportes
Triman Navarra	1
OID Talavera	2

Semi-finals
March 10 - Palacio de los Deportes
Barcelona Alusport	4
Inter Movistar	1
March 10 - Palacio de los Deportes
A. Lobelle	7
OID Talavera	1

Final
March 11 - Palacio de los Deportes
Barcelona Alusport	5
A. Lobelle	3

=== Quarter-finals ===
March 8	Caja Segovia	0–3	FC Barcelona Alusport	Logroño
19:15 (UTC+1)		Report	Sergio Lozano 24', 27'; Saad 31'	Stadium: Palacio de los Deportes; Attendance: 3,500; Referee: Gutiérrez Lumbreras, Gracia Marín

March 8	Inter Movistar	5–0	ElPozo Murcia	Logroño
21:15 (UTC+1)	Batería 2', 31'; Ortiz 23'; Matías 27'; Rafael 36'	Report		Stadium: Palacio de los Deportes; Attendance: 4,000; Referee: Blázquez Sierra, García Morón

March 9	Carnicer Torrejón	2–2 (a.e.t.) (6–7 p)	A. Lobelle Santiago	Logroño
18:30 (UTC+1)	José Carlos 23'; Rivillos 26'	Report	Barroso 4'; Changuinha 38'	Stadium: Palacio de los Deportes; Attendance: 3,500; Referee: Cordero Gallardo, Linares López
	Penalties
	José Carlos (penalty scored); Caio (penalty scored); Chino (penalty scored); David (penalty scored); Rivillos (penalty scored); Rober (penalty scored); Juanlu (penalty missed)		(penalty scored) Aicardo; (penalty scored) Raúl Campos; (penalty scored) Barroso; (penalty scored) Chaguinha; (penalty scored) Charlie; (penalty scored) Luis; (penalty scored) David

March 9	Triman Navarra	1–2	OID Talavera	Logroño
20:30 UTC+1	Rafa Usín 22'	Report	Dantas 13'; Sepe 34'	Stadium: Palacio de los Deportes; Attendance: 3,500; Referee: Peña Díaz, Peña Gómez

=== Semi-finals ===
March 10	FC Barcelona Alusport	4–1	Inter Movistar	Logroño
18:15 (UTC+1)	Sergio Lozano 3'; Igor 16'; Ari 34'; Jordi Torras 36'	Report	Ortiz 14'	Stadium: Palacio de los Deportes; Attendance: 4,000; Referee: Peña Díaz, Peña Gómez

March 10	Lobelle Santiago	7–1	OID Talavera	Logroño
20:15 (UTC+1)	David 2'; Luis 6'; Quintela 12'; Changuinha 15'; Palmas 23'; Charlie 29'; Aicardo 39'	Report	Justo Cáceres 33'	Stadium: Palacio de los Deportes; Attendance: 3,500; Referee: Cordero Gallardo, Linares López

=== Final ===
March 11	FC Barcelona Alusport	5–3 (a.e.t.)	Lobelle Santiago	Logroño
19:00 (UTC+1)	Javi Rodríguez 27'; Wilde 35', 44'; Sergio Lozano 41', 43'	Report	Rául Campos 35'; Rubi 36'; Charlie 45'	Stadium: Palacio de los Deportes; Attendance: 4,300; Referee: Gutiérrez Lumbreras, Gracia Marín

2012 Copa de España winners
(Catalonia)
Barcelona Alusport
Second title

== See also ==
- 2011–12 Primera División de Futsal
- 2011–12 Copa del Rey de Futsal
