= FC Barcelona Futsal =

Futsal section of the FC Barcelona sports club

Barcelona Futsal
- Full name: Futbol Club Barcelona Futsal
- Nickname: Barça
- Founded: 1978; 48 years ago
- Ground: Palau Blaugrana, Barcelona, Spain
- Capacity: 7,585
- President: Joan Laporta
- Head coach: Javi Rodríguez
- League: Primera División
- 2025–26: Regular season: 1st of 16; Playoffs: Champions
- Website: fcbarcelona.com
Home colours	Away colours	Third colours

Futbol Club Barcelona is a professional futsal club based in Barcelona, Catalonia, Spain. It is a part of the FC Barcelona sports club.

Originally FC Barcelona begun to play futsal in 1978, until it was disbanded in 1982. Later, in 1986, the club was re-founded and now plays local matches in the Palau Blaugrana, which has a capacity of 7,585 seats. It is one of the most successful futsal clubs in Spain as well as in Europe.

== History ==
=== First stage of the club ===
The FC Barcelona started playing futsal in 1976, although it was not officially established until September 1978. At that time it was formed by former Barca players gathered to play friendly tournaments and charity matches. Finally, the implementation of futsal in Catalonia led the bank president Josep Lluís Núñez to officially establish a team.

The first stage of FC Barcelona futsal was playing in regional tournaments in Catalonia, where they made a good progression and won the regional title in 1980. Although the club became champions in the first two seasons in that division, the Board agreed to dissolve the club in 1982/83.

=== Admission to LNFS ===
The club did not regain official futsal status until 1986, when they began to take part in tournaments at the national level. FC Barcelona was one of the leaders in the sport at the end of the decade, since in the season 1987/88 reached the final of the Copa de España (FEFS) and in 1988/89 was proclaimed winner of the tournament. In 1990 the Catalan club won the European Cup over Italian champions AS Roma Futsal. Though at the time it was an unofficial tournament.

With the union of competitions Spanish Federation and the Football Association Board, FC Barcelona was one of the first participants in the Liga National Futbol Sala, consisting of 48 teams. Barca passed the first stage of the tournament in second place, but in the second phase finished in last place, so they could not qualify for the playoffs for the title.

The Catalan fleet remained one of the leading clubs in the LNFS until the introduction of the regular season in 1995/96. FC Barcelona reduced the budget section of futsal and the team had to be formed from only homegrown players. Finally, Barça went down to the Second Division in 1997/98.

=== Difficult years ===
Although FC Barcelona set the target to be back in the Division Honor the team finished sixth in their first season in the second division. Finally, Barca was promoted in the 1999/2000 season, finishing second in the regular season and won the playoff for promotion.

However, their return to the Division of Honor was worse than expected. For three seasons the Catalans were at the bottom of the table struggling not to be relegated when in 2002/03 the club finished in 15th place in the standings and were relegated for a second time to the Second Division.

On this occasion, it took FC Barcelona three seasons in the second division before they returned to the top flight. Despite finishing in the top two positions in their three-year spell in the second division Barca fell in the playoffs for promotion. It was not until 2005/06 when, under the coaching of Marc Carmona, that the club was promoted to the first division after defeating Barcelona Gáldar FS in the playoffs.

=== Professionalization of the club ===
After climbing back to the Division of Honor, the president of the club, Joan Laporta, increased the investment in the futsal part of the club. Marc Carmona remained as coach and the club hired international players like Javi Rodriguez, star of Playas de Castellón FS. Although the first season Barca struggled to ensure the permanence, in the year 2007/08 the team finished sixth in the regular season, qualifying for the playoffs for the first time in 11 years.

The football team took their professionalism and, like other sports sections of Barca, had its own sponsor: Senseit (2007), Mobicat (2008) and Alusport (2010). In 2008/09 Barca finish third in the league, but fell in the quarterfinals of the playoffs. In the following year Barca got back into the fight for the title and reached the final, where they lost to eventual champions El Pozo Murcia. In the 2010/11 season, FC Barcelona made history by winning his first official title in futsal, the Copa de España in the final by beating defending champions El Pozo Murcia and also were crowned champions of the first edition of the Copa del Rey, defeating Inter Movistar. Then on 26 June 2011 they completed the season with a historic treble to become champion of the LNFS.

With their first league title FC Barcelona was eligible to play in the UEFA Futsal Cup for the first time in the 2011/2012 season. They entered in the Main round and progressed through the Elite round and into the Final Four. In the Final Four they played Sporting CP in the semis and won comfortably 5–1. With that win they progressed to the final and played against MFK Dinamo Moskva and defeated them 3–1. FC Barcelona's first foray into European competition in 21 years ended with lifting the UEFA Futsal Cup. Since that initial tournament Barca have been a mainstay in the competition by making it into the Final Four each season since and winning another trophy in 2013/2014.

On September 10, 2013, Barca won the Supercopa of Spain, the only title of all the national tournaments that had eluded them. With the Super Cup win, the football club has won all the competitions they have played in.

On May 24, 2016, after 12 years the club announced that Marc Carmona would not continue as the team's coach. Therefore, it ended a brilliant stage of the section under his direction in which the team won 19 titles: 2 Champions (2010, 2014), 3 Leagues (2010–11, 2011–2012, 2012–2013), 3 Spanish Cups (2011, 2012, 2013), 4 King's Cups (2011, 2012, 2013, 2014), 1 Spanish Super Cup (2013) and 6 Catalonia Cups (2008, 2009, 2010, 2013, 2014, 2015). Then, Andreu Plaza was appointed the team's new coach.

At the end of the season 2020–2021, Barça won the domestic futsal League title. This was Barça's fifth domestic futsal league title, and the 12th trophy in total of the Plaza-Lahoz era, which has included one Champions League. The club reported that Andreu Plaza was no longer the team's coach.

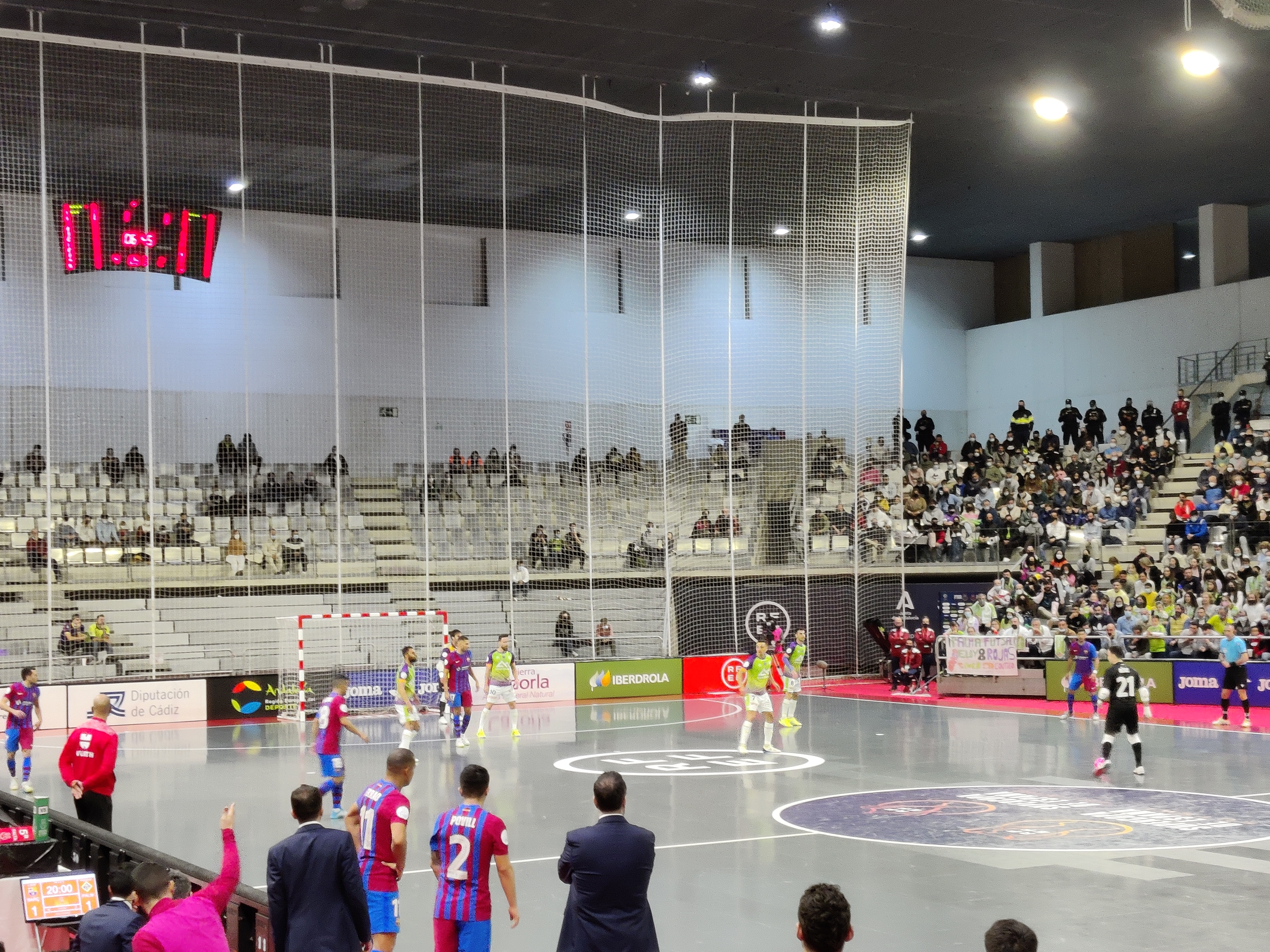
Supercopa 2022 final

Jesús Velasco was appointed the new FC Barcelona futsal coach, and signed a contract until 2023 with Sergi Altisent named as his assistant. The futsal team won 4 trophies (Super Cup, Spanish Cup, Champions League and Spanish League) in Velasco's first season (2021–22) for the second time in their history after doing so under coach Marc Carmona in 2012. In the next season the team successfully defended 3 title (Super Cup, Copa Del Rey, and Spanish League). However they were eliminated in the elite round on goal difference in the Champions League. In the 2023–24 season the team won the Spanish cup for the 7th time, which turned out to be the club's only trophy that season. The team also reached the Champions League final, where they were defeated by Palma Futsal.

== Honours ==
=== National competitions ===
- Primera División: 8
  - 2010–11, 2011–12, 2012–13, 2018–19, 2020–21, 2021–22, 2022–23, 2025–26
- Copa del Rey: 8 – record
  - 2010–11, 2011–12, 2012–13, 2013–14, 2017–18, 2018–19, 2019–20, 2022–23
- Supercopa de España: 4
  - 2013, 2019, 2022, 2023
- Copa de España (LNFS): 7
  - 2011, 2012, 2013, 2019, 2020, 2022, 2024

=== European competitions ===
- UEFA Futsal Champions League: 4
  - 2011–12, 2013–14, 2019–20, 2021–22

=== Regional competitions ===
- Catalonia Cup: 11
  - 1999-00, 2008–09, 2009–10, 2010–11, 2013–14, 2014–15, 2015–16, 2016–17, 2017–18, 2018–19, 2022–23

== Current squad ==
As of 20 December 2025

Note: Flags indicate national team as defined under FIFA eligibility rules; some limited exceptions apply. Players may hold more than one non-FIFA nationality.

No.	Pos.	Nation	Player
21	Goalkeeper	ESP	Dídac Plana (captain)
26	Goalkeeper	ESP	Miquel Feixas
6	Defender	ESP	Antonio Pérez
17	Defender	POR	João Victor
22		FRA	Souheil Mouhoudine
3	Winger	BRA	Matheus Silva
8	Winger	ESP	Adolfo Fernández
11	Winger	FRA	Mamadou Touré
13	Winger	ESP	Juanjo Catela
14	Winger	ESP	Eric Martel
16	Winger	ESP	Sergio González
23	Winger	ARG	Luciano Gauna
7		BRA	Higor Ribeiro
10	Pivot	BRA	Pito

== Current technical staff ==
Position	Staff
Head Coach	(Spain) Javi Rodríguez
Assistant Coach	(Spain) Jordi Illa Solé
Physiotherapists	(Spain) Ramon Giró (Spain) Héctor García
Club Doctors	(Spain) Lucas Gómez (Spain) Carles Miñarro
Kit Manager	(Spain) Xavier Fernández
Delegate	(Spain) Julio Gracia

Last updated: 20 December 2025
Source: LNFS

== Season to season ==
Season	Tier	Division	Place	Notes
1989/90	1	D. Honor	2nd	
1990/91	1	D. Honor	6th	
1991/92	1	D. Honor	3rd	
1992/93	1	D. Honor	6th	
1993/94	1	D. Honor	4th	
1994/95	1	D. Honor	5th	
1995/96	1	D. Honor	11th	
1996/97	1	D. Honor	6th	
1997/98	1	D. Honor	17th	
1998/99	2	D. Plata	6th	
1999/00	2	D. Plata	2nd	
2000/01	1	D. Honor	14th	
2001/02	1	D. Honor	12th	
2002/03	1	D. Honor	15th	
2003/04	2	D. Plata	2nd	

Season	Tier	Division	Place	Notes
2004/05	2	D. Plata	1st	
2005/06	2	D. Plata	2nd	
2006/07	1	D. Honor	13th	
2007/08	1	D. Honor	6th / SF	
2008/09	1	D. Honor	3rd / QF	
2009/10	1	D. Honor	5th / SF	
2010/11	1	D. Honor	1st / W	
2011/12	1	1ª División	2nd / W	
2012/13	1	1ª División	1st / W	
2013/14	1	1ª División	3rd / SF	
2014/15	1	1ª División	2nd / SF	
2015/16	1	1ª División	2nd / F	
2016/17	1	1ª División	3rd / F	
2017/18	1	1ª División	2nd / F	
2018/19	1	1ª División	1st / W	

Season	Tier	Division	Place	Notes
2019/20	1	1ª División	2nd / QF	
2020/21	1	1ª División	3rd / W	
2021/22	1	1ª División	1st / W	
2022/23	1	1ª División	2nd / W	
2023/24	1	1ª División	1st / SF	
2024/25	1	1ª División	3rd / F	
2025/26	1	1ª División	1st / W	

- 31 seasons in Primera División
- 5 seasons in Segunda División

== European competitions record ==
Appearances: 10

Season	Competition	Round	Country	Opponent	Result	Venue (Host City)	Qualified
2011/12	UEFA Futsal Cup	Main Round (Group B)	(Bosnia and Herzegovina)	FK Leotar	9–0	Zemgales; Olympic Centre (Jelgava)	1st place
2011/12	UEFA Futsal Cup	Main Round (Group B)	(Hungary)	Győri ETO	8–2	Zemgales; Olympic Centre (Jelgava)	1st place
2011/12	UEFA Futsal Cup	Main Round (Group B)	(Latvia)	Nikars Riga	12–0	Zemgales; Olympic Centre (Jelgava)	1st place
2011/12	UEFA Futsal Cup	Elite Round (Group B)	(Czech Republic)	Era-Pack Chrudim	6–0	Palau; Blaugrana (Barcelona)	1st place
2011/12	UEFA Futsal Cup	Elite Round (Group B)	(Netherlands)	CF Eindhoven	4–0	Palau; Blaugrana (Barcelona)	1st place
2011/12	UEFA Futsal Cup	Elite Round (Group B)	(Azerbaijan)	Araz Naxçivan	2–2	Palau; Blaugrana (Barcelona)	1st place
2011/12	UEFA Futsal Cup	Semifinals	(Portugal)	Sporting CP	5–1	Pavelló; Barris Nord (Lleida)	
2011/12	UEFA Futsal Cup	Final	(Russia)	Dinamo Moskva	3–1	Pavelló; Barris Nord (Lleida)	Champions
2012/13	UEFA Futsal Cup	Elite Round (Group A)	(Croatia)	MNK Split	18–0	Tri Lilije Hall (Laško)	1st place
2012/13	UEFA Futsal Cup	Elite Round (Group A)	(Azerbaijan)	Araz Naxçivan	7–1	Tri Lilije Hall (Laško)	1st place
2012/13	UEFA Futsal Cup	Elite Round (Group A)	(Slovenia)	FC Litija	3–0	Tri Lilije Hall (Laško)	1st place
2012/13	UEFA Futsal Cup	Semifinals	(Kazakhstan)	AFC Kairat	4–5	Sportis Sasakhle (Tbilisi)	
2012/13	UEFA Futsal Cup	3rd Place Match	(Georgia (country))	Iberia Star	4–1	Sportis Sasakhle (Tbilisi)	3rd Place
2013/14	UEFA Futsal Cup	Elite Round (Group A)	(Ukraine)	Lokomotyv Kharkiv	6–1	Sportovní Hala (Chrudim)	1st place
2013/14	UEFA Futsal Cup	Elite Round (Group A)	(Romania)	City'US Târgu Mureș	10–1	Sportovní Hala (Chrudim)	1st place
2013/14	UEFA Futsal Cup	Elite Round (Group A)	(Czech Republic)	Era-Pack Chrudim	4–1	Sportovní Hala (Chrudim)	1st place
2013/14	UEFA Futsal Cup	Semifinals	(Azerbaijan)	Araz Naxçivan	4–4 (4–2 p)	Sarhadchi; Olympic Center (Baku)	
2013/14	UEFA Futsal Cup	Final	(Russia)	Dinamo Moskva	5–2	Sarhadchi; Olympic Center (Baku)	Champions
2014/15	UEFA Futsal Cup	Elite Round (Group D)	(Ukraine)	Lokomotyv Kharkiv	5–0	Palau; Blaugrana (Barcelona)	1st place
2014/15	UEFA Futsal Cup	Elite Round (Group D)	(Hungary)	FC Berettyóújfalu	4–1	Palau; Blaugrana (Barcelona)	1st place
2014/15	UEFA Futsal Cup	Elite Round (Group D)	(England)	Baku United FC	5–1	Palau; Blaugrana (Barcelona)	1st place
2014/15	UEFA Futsal Cup	Semifinals	(Portugal)	Sporting CP	5–3	Altice Arena (Lisbon)	
2014/15	UEFA Futsal Cup	Final	(Kazakhstan)	AFC Kairat	2–3	Altice Arena (Lisbon)	Runners-up
2017/18	UEFA Futsal Cup	Main Round (Group 4)	(Hungary)	Győri ETO	7–0	Kioene Arena (Padua)	1st place
2017/18	UEFA Futsal Cup	Main Round (Group 4)	(Czech Republic)	Era-Pack Chrudim	2–0	Kioene Arena (Padua)	1st place
2017/18	UEFA Futsal Cup	Main Round (Group 4)	(Italy)	Luparense	3–3	Kioene Arena (Padua)	1st place
2017/18	UEFA Futsal Cup	Elite Round (Group A)	(Netherlands)	ZVV 't Knooppunt	6–0	Palasport; Giovanni Paolo II (Pescara)	1st place
2017/18	UEFA Futsal Cup	Elite Round (Group A)	(Serbia)	KMF Ekonomac	3–2	Palasport; Giovanni Paolo II (Pescara)	1st place
2017/18	UEFA Futsal Cup	Elite Round (Group A)	(Italy)	Pescara	3–1	Palasport; Giovanni Paolo II (Pescara)	1st place
2017/18	UEFA Futsal Cup	Semifinals	(Spain)	Inter FS	1–2	Pabellón Ppe. Felipe (Zaragoza)	
2017/18	UEFA Futsal Cup	3rd Place Match	(Hungary)	Győri ETO	7–1	Pabellón Ppe. Felipe (Zaragoza)	3rd Place
2018/19	UEFA Futsal; Champions League	Main Round (Group 1)	(France)	K-B United	4–2	Sportcomplex; De Bres (Halle)	2nd place
2018/19	UEFA Futsal; Champions League	Main Round (Group 1)	(Portugal)	Benfica	1–1	Sportcomplex; De Bres (Halle)	2nd place
2018/19	UEFA Futsal; Champions League	Main Round (Group 1)	(Belgium)	Halle-Gooik	7–3	Sportcomplex; De Bres (Halle)	2nd place
2018/19	UEFA Futsal; Champions League	Elite Round (Group B)	(Serbia)	KMF Ekonomac	6–1	Palau Blaugrana (Barcelona)	1st place
2018/19	UEFA Futsal; Champions League	Elite Round (Group B)	(Poland)	Rekord Bielsko-Biała	3–1	Palau Blaugrana (Barcelona)	1st place
2018/19	UEFA Futsal; Champions League	Elite Round (Group B)	(Russia)	Gazprom-Ugra	2–0	Palau Blaugrana (Barcelona)	1st place
2018/19	UEFA Futsal; Champions League	Semifinals	(Kazakhstan)	AFC Kairat	2–5	Almaty Arena (Almaty)	
2018/19	UEFA Futsal; Champions League	3rd Place Match	(Spain)	Inter FS	3–1	Almaty Arena (Almaty)	3rd Place
2019/20	UEFA Futsal; Champions League	Main Round (Group 3)	(Russia)	MFK Tyumen	1–0	Jonava; Sports Arena (Jonava)	1st place
2019/20	UEFA Futsal; Champions League	Main Round (Group 3)	(Kazakhstan)	MFC Ayat	7–1	Jonava; Sports Arena (Jonava)	1st place
2019/20	UEFA Futsal; Champions League	Main Round (Group 3)	(Lithuania)	Vytis	8–0	Jonava; Sports Arena (Jonava)	1st place
2019/20	UEFA Futsal; Champions League	Elite Round (Group D)	(Czech Republic)	Sparta Praha	2–1	Sports Hall SCA (Minsk)	1st place
2019/20	UEFA Futsal; Champions League	Elite Round (Group D)	(Ukraine)	Prodexim Kherson	4–2	Sports Hall SCA (Minsk)	1st place
2019/20	UEFA Futsal; Champions League	Elite Round (Group D)	(Belarus)	Stalitsa Minsk	6–1	Sports Hall SCA (Minsk)	1st place
2019/20	UEFA Futsal; Champions League	Semifinals	(Russia)	KPRF	3–3 (5–4 p)	Palau Blaugrana (Barcelona)	
2019/20	UEFA Futsal; Champions League	Final	(Spain)	ElPozo Murcia	2–1	Palau Blaugrana (Barcelona)	Champions
2020/21	UEFA Futsal; Champions League	Round of 32	(Kosovo)	FC Prishtina	9–2	Palau Blaugrana (Barcelona)	
2020/21	UEFA Futsal; Champions League	Round of 16	(France)	ACCS	2–1	Palau Blaugrana (Barcelona)	
2020/21	UEFA Futsal; Champions League	Quarterfinals	(Slovenia)	FK Dobovec	2–0	Krešimir; Ćosić Hall (Zadar)	
2020/21	UEFA Futsal; Champions League	Semifinals	(Kazakhstan)	AFC Kairat	3–2	Krešimir; Ćosić Hall (Zadar)	
2020/21	UEFA Futsal; Champions League	Final	(Portugal)	Sporting CP	3–4	Krešimir; Ćosić Hall (Zadar)	Runners-up
2021/22	UEFA Futsal; Champions League	Main Round (Group 3)	(Belarus)	Viten Orsha	5–1	Žalgiris Arena (Kaunas)	1st place
2021/22	UEFA Futsal; Champions League	Main Round (Group 3)	(Spain)	Levante UD	9–2	Žalgiris Arena (Kaunas)	1st place
2021/22	UEFA Futsal; Champions League	Main Round (Group 3)	(Lithuania)	Kauno Žalgiris	7–1	Žalgiris Arena (Kaunas)	1st place
2021/22	UEFA Futsal; Champions League	Elite Round (Group C)	(Slovenia)	FK Dobovec	8–2	Lokomotiva Plzeň (Plzeň)	1st place
2021/22	UEFA Futsal; Champions League	Elite Round (Group C)	(Belgium)	Halle-Gooik	8–4	Lokomotiva Plzeň (Plzeň)	1st place
2021/22	UEFA Futsal; Champions League	Elite Round (Group C)	(Czech Republic)	Interobal Plzeň	3–1	Lokomotiva Plzeň (Plzeň)	1st place
2021/22	UEFA Futsal; Champions League	Semifinals	(Portugal)	Benfica	5–4	Arena Riga (Riga)	
2021/22	UEFA Futsal; Champions League	Final	(Portugal)	Sporting CP	4–0	Arena Riga (Riga)	Champions
2022/23	UEFA Futsal; Champions League	Main Round (Group 3)	(Netherlands)	Hovocubo	6–1	Tal-Qroqq; Sports Hall (Gżira)	1st place
2022/23	UEFA Futsal; Champions League	Main Round (Group 3)	(Slovenia)	FK Dobovec	8–0	Tal-Qroqq; Sports Hall (Gżira)	1st place
2022/23	UEFA Futsal; Champions League	Main Round (Group 3)	(Malta)	Luxol St Andrews	7–1	Tal-Qroqq; Sports Hall (Gżira)	1st place
2022/23	UEFA Futsal; Champions League	Elite Round (Group D)	(Romania)	United Galați	6–2	Mate Parlov; Sport Centre (Pula)	2nd place
2022/23	UEFA Futsal; Champions League	Elite Round (Group D)	(Belgium)	Anderlecht	5–5	Mate Parlov; Sport Centre (Pula)	2nd place
2022/23	UEFA Futsal; Champions League	Elite Round (Group D)	(Croatia)	Futsal Pula	7–2	Mate Parlov; Sport Centre (Pula)	2nd place
2023/24	UEFA Futsal; Champions League	Main Round (Group 2)	(Malta)	Luxol St Andrews	6–0	Lagator Hall (Loznica)	1st place
2023/24	UEFA Futsal; Champions League	Main Round (Group 2)	(Belgium)	Anderlecht	2–1	Lagator Hall (Loznica)	1st place
2023/24	UEFA Futsal; Champions League	Main Round (Group 2)	(Serbia)	KMF Loznica-Grad	2–0	Lagator Hall (Loznica)	1st place
2023/24	UEFA Futsal; Champions League	Elite Round (Group A)	(Italy)	Feldi Eboli	2–2	Zemgale Olympic Center (Jelgava)	1st place
2023/24	UEFA Futsal; Champions League	Elite Round (Group A)	(France)	Étoile Lavalloise	7–0	Zemgale Olympic Center (Jelgava)	1st place
2023/24	UEFA Futsal; Champions League	Elite Round (Group A)	(Latvia)	Riga FC	3–2	Zemgale Olympic Center (Jelgava)	1st place
2023/24	UEFA Futsal; Champions League	Semifinals	(Portugal)	Sporting CP	5–4	Karen Demirchyan Complex (Yerevan)	
2023/24	UEFA Futsal; Champions League	Final	(Spain)	Palma Futsal	1–5	Karen Demirchyan Complex (Yerevan)	Runners-up

=== Summary ===
UEFA competitions
Competition	Played	Won	Drawn	Lost	Goals For	Goals Against	Goal Difference	Last season played
UEFA Futsal Cup	31	26	2	3	167	39	+128	2017–18
UEFA Futsal; Champions League	43	37	3	3	196	72	+124	2023–24
Total	74	63	5	6	363	111	+252	

== Barça Atlètic ==
Barça Atlètic
- Full name: Futsal Club Barcelona Atlètic
- Founded: 1989; 37 years ago
- Ground: Ciutat Esportiva Joan Gamper, Sant Joan Despí, Spain
- Capacity: 1,000
- Chairman: Joan Laporta
- Head coach: Sergi Altisent
- League: Segunda División
- 2020–21: Group A, 2nd of 9 Group C, 6th of 8

Founded in 1989 as FC Barcelona Futsal B, Barça Atlètic is the futsal reserve team of FC Barcelona Futsal, and currently plays in Segunda División de Futsal. In the 2016–17 season they topped the Segunda División de Futsal table but were unable to compete in the playoff due to being a reserve team.

Reserve teams in Spain play in the same league system as the senior team, rather than in a reserve team league. They must play at least one level below their main side, and thus Barça Atlètic are ineligible for promotion to Primera División. They also cannot play in the Copa del Rey. Nonetheless, all players from the Barça Atlètic squad are eligible to play with the main team on any competition.

=== Current squad ===
As of 5 November 2024

#	Position	Name	Nationality
1	Goalkeeper	Pau López	(Spain)
13	Goalkeeper	Iker Abad	(Spain)
5	Defender	Sergi Viedma	(Spain)
10	Defender	Pau Recasens	(Spain)
2	Winger	Albert Ortas	(Spain)
4	Winger	Quim Romeu	(Spain)
6	Winger	Uri López	(Spain)
7	Winger	Rubén Rodó	(Spain)
11	Winger	Rubén Sánchez	(Spain)
12	Winger	Aniol Vendrell	(Spain)
16	Winger	Adrià Sánchez	(Spain)
8	Pivot	Pol Cano	(Spain)
9	Pivot	Nicolás Marrón	(Spain)
