= Copa del Rey de Futsal =

Copa del Rey
- Founded: 2010
- Region: Spain
- Teams: 42 (total)
- Current champions: Jaén Paraíso Interior (2026)
- Most championships: Barcelona (8 titles)
- Broadcaster(s): Teledeporte, RTVE Play
- 2025–26

The Copa del Rey de Futsal is an annual cup competition for Spanish futsal teams. It is organized by the Royal Spanish Football Federation and was founded in the 2010–11 season.

== Finals ==
| Season | Location | Winner | Runner-up | Score |
|---|---|---|---|---|
| 2011 | Toledo | Barcelona | Inter Movistar | 4–3 |
| 2012 | Antequera | Barcelona | ElPozo Murcia | 6–3 |
| 2013 | Irun | Barcelona | ElPozo Murcia | 6–3 |
| 2014 | Bilbao | Barcelona | ElPozo Murcia | 4–3 |
| 2015 | Águilas | Inter Movistar | Marfil Santa Coloma | 3–0 |
| 2016 | Seville | ElPozo Murcia | Palma Futsal | 3–2 |
| 2017 | Guadalajara | ElPozo Murcia | Magna Gurpea | 3–2 |
| 2018 | Cáceres | Barcelona | Jaén Paraíso Interior | 4–3 |
| 2019 | Ciudad Real | Barcelona | Jaén Paraíso Interior | 5–2 |
| 2020 | Málaga | Barcelona | Jaén Paraíso Interior | 2–1 |
| 2021 | Santa Coloma | Inter Movistar | ElPozo Murcia | 5–3 |
| 2022 | Jaén | UMA Antequera | Viña Albali Valdepeñas | 3–2 |
| 2023 | Cartagena | Barcelona | Cartagena | 4–3 (a.e.t) |
| 2024 | Seville | Real Betis | Cartagena | 3–3 ^{(5–3 pen.)} |
| 2025 | Cartagena | Movistar Inter | Jaén Paraíso Interior | 6–1 |
| 2026 | Cáceres | Jaén Paraíso Interior | Jimbee Cartagena | 5–3 |

=== Winners by titles ===
| Club | Winners | Runners-up | Winning years |
|---|---|---|---|
| Barcelona | 8 | 0 | 2011, 2012, 2013, 2014, 2018, 2019, 2020, 2023 |
| Inter Movistar | 3 | 1 | 2015, 2021, 2025 |
| ElPozo Murcia | 2 | 4 | 2016, 2017 |
| UMA Antequera | 1 | 0 | 2022 |
| Real Betis | 1 | 0 | 2024 |
| Jaén Paraíso Interior | 1 | 4 | 2026 |
| Cartagena | 0 | 3 | |
| Marfil Santa Coloma | 0 | 1 | |
| Palma Futsal | 0 | 1 | |
| Magna Gurpea | 0 | 1 | |
| Viña Albali Valdepeñas | 0 | 1 | |

== Related competitions ==
- Primera División de Futsal
- Segunda División de Futsal
- Supercopa de España de Futsal
- Copa de España de Futsal
