= 2012–13 Primera División de Futsal =

Primera División
- Season: 2012–13
- Champions: FC Barcelona Alusport
- Relegated: Puertollano FS
- UEFA Futsal Cup: FC Barcelona Alusport
- Matches: 182
- Goals: 1,191 (6.54 per match)
- Top goalscorer: Dani Salgado (Marfil Santa Coloma) – 44 goals
- Biggest home win: Marfil Santa Coloma 10–1 Colegios Arenas Gáldar
- Biggest away win: Puertollano 0–12 FC Barcelona Alusport
- Highest scoring: Triman Navarra 8–5 Marfil Santa Coloma

The 2012–13 season of the Primera División de Fútbol Sala was the 24th season of top-tier futsal in Spain. It was the second season under the "Primera División" name. The regular season started on September 14, 2012 and finished on May 3, 2013. The championship playoffs began on May 18 with quarter-finals series and concluded with the championship final series from 11–22 June.

Top eight teams play the championship playoffs.

Barcelona Alusport were defending champions and will remain so for next season by defeating ElPozo Murcia 3–1 in the Championship Final series.

== Teams ==
=== Personnel and kits ===
Team	Location	Manager	Kit manufacturer	Shirt sponsor
FC Barcelona Alusport	Barcelona	Marc Carmona	Nike	Alusport
ElPozo Murcia	Murcia	"Duda"	Luanvi	ElPozo
Inter Movistar	Alcalá de Henares	Jesús Velasco	Joma	Movistar
Caja Segovia	Segovia	David Madrid	Kelme	Caja Segovia
Umacon Zaragoza	Zaragoza	Santi Herrero	Joma	Umacon
Triman Navarra	Pamplona	Imanol Arregui	Lotto	Triman
Santiago	Santiago de Compostela	Santiago Valladares	Macron	Cupa
Ríos Renovables R.N.	Tudela	"Pato"	Kelme	Ríos Renovables
Marfil Santa Coloma	Santa Coloma	Xavi Passarrius	Kelme	Marfil Alella
Azkar Lugo	Lugo	Diego Ríos	Lotto	Azkar
Fisiomedia Manacor	Manacor	Tomás de Dios	Macron	Fisiomedia
Burela Pescados Rubén	Burela	Juan Luis Alonso	Joma	Pescados Rubén
Colegios Arenas Gáldar	Gáldar	Suso Méndez	Zeus	Colegios Arenas
Puertollano	Puertollano	David Ramos	Joma	Ayuntamiento de Puertollano

=== Stadia and locations ===
Location of teams in Primera División 2012–13
Canary Islands

Team	Location	Stadium	Capacity
ElPozo Murcia	Murcia	Palacio de Deportes de Murcia	7,500
Barcelona Alusport	Barcelona	Palau Blaugrana	7,500
Inter Movistar	Alcalá de Henares	Pabellón Caja Madrid	4,500
Caja Segovia	Segovia	Pabellón Pedro Delgado	2,800
Santiago	Santiago de Compostela	Pabellón Multiusos Fontes do Sar	6,000
Triman Navarra	Pamplona	Pabellón Universitario de Navarra	3,000
Umacon Zaragoza	Zaragoza	Pabellón Siglo XXI	2,500
Puertollano	Puertollano	Polideportivo Antonio Rivilla	2,000
Fisiomedia Manacor	Manacor	Palma Arena	5,000
Ríos Renovables R.N.	Tudela	Polideportivo Ciudad de Tudela	1,200
Azkar Lugo	Lugo	Pabellón Municipal de Lugo	2,300
Marfil Santa Coloma	Santa Coloma de Gramenet	Jacint Verdaguer	2,500
Colegios Arenas Gáldar	Gáldar	Juan Beltrán Sierra	1,500
Burela Pescados Rubén	Burela	Vista Alegre	1,040

== League table ==
	Team	Pld	W	D	L	GF	GA	GD	Pts
1	Barcelona Alusport	26	22	1	3	133	45	88	67
2	ElPozo Murcia	26	18	5	3	117	62	55	59
3	Inter Movistar	26	18	3	5	103	50	53	57
4	Caja Segovia	26	17	2	7	103	79	24	53
5	Umacon Zaragoza	26	15	2	9	83	75	8	47
6	Triman Navarra	26	13	6	7	91	82	9	45
7	Santiago	26	13	4	9	85	71	14	43
8	Ríos Renovables R.N.	26	11	3	12	88	96	−8	36
9	Marfil Santa Coloma	26	10	2	14	110	123	−13	32
10	Azkar Lugo	26	5	6	15	75	115	−40	21
11	Fisiomedia Manacor	26	4	9	13	64	81	−17	21
12	Burela Pescados Rubén	26	4	7	15	48	87	−39	19
13	Colegios Arenas Gáldar	26	2	2	22	54	109	−55	8
14	Puertollano	26	3	2	21	37	116	−79	7

Puertollano; 4 points deducted.

Source: Liga Nacional de Futbol Sala

Championship playoffs
Relegation to Segunda División

== Championship playoffs ==
=== Calendar ===
Round	Date	Fixtures	Clubs	Notes
Quarter-finals	18/25/26 May 2013	8	8 → 4	
Semifinals	1/8/9 June 2013	4	4 → 2	
Final	11/15/16/22/23 June 2013	3	2 → 1	

=== Bracket ===
quarter-finals
4	Caja Segovia	5	5
5	Umacon Zaragoza	3	0
1	FC Barcelona Alusport	3 (5)	1 (5)
8	Ríos Renovables R.N.	3 (3)	1 (3)
3	Inter Movistar	5	5
6	Triman Navarra	4	4
2	ElPozo Murcia	4	4	8
7	Santiago	6	2	1

semifinals
4	Caja Segovia	5	2	0
1	FC Barcelona Alusport	4	7	5
3	Inter Movistar	5	3	2
2	ElPozo Murcia	2	5	3

final
1	FC Barcelona Alusport	1	2	6	3 (5)
2	ElPozo Murcia	0	3	3	3 (3)

2012–13 Primera División winners
(Catalonia)
Barcelona Alusport
Third title

=== Quarter-finals ===
==== 1st leg ====
May 17, 2013	Triman Navarra	4–5 (a.e.t.)	Inter Movistar	Pamplona
19:30 (UTC+2)	Carlitos 8'; Ximbinha 14'; Rafa Usín 34'; Martil 36'	Report	Oitomeia 11', 20'; Gadeia 38'; Borruto 40'; Álvaro 42'	Stadium: Pabellón Anaitasuna; Attendance: 2,300; Referee: Contreras Tejedor, Pérez Álvarez

May 18, 2013	Umacon Zaragoza	3–5	Caja Segovia	Zaragoza
13:00 (UTC+2)	Alvarito 9'; Chicho 20'; Carlos Muñoz 28'	Report	José Carlos 2'; Borja 15', 18', 25'; Pablo del Moral 21'	Stadium: Pabellón Siglo XXI; Attendance: 1,150; Referee: Martínez Segovia, Sánchez Molina

May 18, 2013	Ríos Renovables R.N.	3–3 (a.e.t.) (3–5 p)	FC Barcelona Alusport	Tudela
18:30 (UTC+2)	Rubi 15'; Charlie 35'; Andresito 38'	Report	Wilde 3'; Fernandão 15'; Sergio Lozano 37'	Stadium: Ciudad de Tudela; Attendance: 1,200; Referee: Ponce Medero, Lopez Jiménez
	Penalties
	Nano Modrego (penalty scored); David (penalty scored); Lolo (penalty scored); Andresito (penalty missed)		(penalty scored) Wilde; (penalty scored) Sergio Lozano; (penalty scored) Lin; (penalty scored) Ari; (penalty scored) Torras

May 18, 2013	Santiago	6–4	ElPozo Murcia	Santiago de Compostela
20:00 (UTC+2)	Paulinho 6' (o.g.); Hugo 14', 38', 39'; Lucho 29'; Álex 40'	Report	Álex 2', 19', 29'; Gréllo 26'	Stadium: Fontes do Sar; Attendance: 2,500; Referee: Gallo Suárez, Velasco Martínez

==== 2nd leg ====
May 24, 2013	ElPozo Murcia	4–2	Santiago	Murcia
21:00 (UTC+2)	Gréllo 5'; Miguelín 10', 40'; Álex 20'	Report	Barroso 21'; Brandi 39'	Stadium: Palacio de Deportes; Attendance: 2,000; Referee: Cuesta Sánchez, García Morón

May 24, 2013	FC Barcelona Alusport	1–1 (a.e.t.) (5–3 p)	Ríos Renovables R.N.	Barcelona
21:00 (UTC+2)	Saad 42'	Report	Charlie 42'	Stadium: Palau Blaugrana; Attendance: 3,500; Referee: Alonso Montesinos, Rubio Fajardo
	Penalties
	Wilde (penalty scored); Sergio Lozano (penalty scored); Lin (penalty scored); Ari (penalty scored); Torras (penalty scored)		(penalty scored) Jonathan; (penalty scored) David; (penalty missed) Lolo; (penalty scored) Andresito

FC Barcelona Alusport won series 2–0 and advanced to Semifinals

May 25, 2013	Inter Movistar	5–4 (a.e.t.)	Triman Navarra	Alcalá de Henares
13:00 (UTC+2)	Bateria 1', 3'; Rivillos 29'; Juanjo 43'; Tobe 44'		Ximbinha 23'; Rafa Usín 34', 36'; Araça 43'	Stadium: Pabellón Caja Madrid; Attendance: 3,000; Referee: Fortes Pardo, Martínez Flores

Inter Movistar won series 2–0 and advanced to Semifinals

May 25, 2013	Caja Segovia	5–0	Umacon Zaragoza	Segovia
18:30 (UTC+2)	Sergio 10'; Palomeque 11'; Borja 30'; Antoñito 34'; David 38'	Report		Stadium: Pabellón Pedro Delgado; Attendance: 1,800; Referee: Moreno Reina, Ramos Marín

Caja Segovia won series 2–0 and advanced to Semifinals

==== 3rd leg ====
May 26, 2013	ElPozo Murcia	8–1	Santiago	Murcia
12:00 (UTC+2)	Álex 3', 35'; Paulinho 21'; Bebe 27'; Miguelín 28', 39'; Gréllo 34', 37'	Report	Brandi 19'	Stadium: Palacio de Deportes; Attendance: 3,000; Referee: Gracia Marín, Munez Carpintero

ElPozo Murcia won series 2–1 and advanced to Semifinals

=== Semifinals ===
==== 1st leg ====
May 31, 2013	Inter Movistar	5–2	ElPozo Murcia	Alcalá de Henares
21:00 (UTC+2)	Gadeia 20'; Bateria 22', 28'; Rafael 23'; Ortiz 27'	Report	Álex 31'; Franklin 34'	Stadium: Pabellón Caja Madrid; Attendance: 4,000; Referee: Blázquez Sierra, García Donas Salvador

June 1, 2013	Caja Segovia	5–4	FC Barcelona Alusport	Segovia
13:00 (UTC+2)	David 5'; Borja 10'; Sergio 20'; José Carlos 23'; Palomeque 35'	Report	Lin 2'; Wilde 19'; Sergio Lozano 27'; Fernandão 39'	Stadium: Pedro Delgado; Referee: Gutiérrez Lumbreras, Lope Díaz

==== 2nd leg ====
June 7, 2013	FC Barcelona Alusport	7–2	Caja Segovia	Barcelona
21:35 (UTC+2)	Aicardo 13'; Lin 14'; Wilde 17'; Sergio Lozano 22', 28'; Torras 29'; Igor 37'	Report	Antoñito 5'; Palomeque 15'	Stadium: Palau Blaugrana; Attendance: 5,103; Referee: Díaz Rodríguez, García Hernández

June 8, 2013	ElPozo Murcia	5–3	Inter Movistar	Murcia
13:00 (UTC+2)	Kike 9'; Gréllo 14', 28'; Juampi 14'; Álex 36'	Report	Bateria 27'; Rivillos 30'; Álvaro 34'	Stadium: Palacio de Deportes; Attendance: 3,000; Referee: Moreno Reina, Ramos Marín

==== 3rd leg ====
June 9, 2013	FC Barcelona Alusport	5–0	Caja Segovia	Barcelona
17:00 (UTC+2)	Lin 22', 37'; Saad 23'; Ari 38'; Aicardo 39'	Report		Stadium: Palau Blaugrana; Attendance: 4,236; Referee: Sanzol Goñi, Martínez Flores

FC Barcelona Alusport won series 2–1 and advanced to Final

June 9, 2013	ElPozo Murcia	3–2 (a.e.t.)	Inter Movistar	Murcia
20:00 (UTC+2)	Adri 29'; Kike 42'; Álex 44'	Report	Pola 1'; Álvaro 41'	Stadium: Palacio de Deportes; Attendance: 3,000; Referee: Peña Díaz, Peña Gómez

ElPozo Murcia won series 2–1 and advanced to Final

=== Final ===
==== 1st leg ====
June 12, 2013	FC Barcelona Alusport	1–0	ElPozo Murcia	Barcelona
21:45 (UTC+2)	Torras 27'			Stadium: Palau Blaugrana; Attendance: 4,257; Referee: Gutiérrez Lumbreras, Lopez Díaz

==== 2nd leg ====
June 15, 2013	ElPozo Murcia	3–2	FC Barcelona Alusport	Murcia
13:15 (UTC+2)	Bebe 7'; Álex 14'; Miguelín 28'	Report	Torras 14'; Wilde 24'	Stadium: Palacio de Deportes; Attendance: 5,600; Referee: Cordero Gallardo, Linares López

==== 3rd leg ====
June 16, 2013	ElPozo Murcia	3–6	FC Barcelona Alusport	Murcia
18:45 (UTC+2)	Gréllo 22'; Álex 34'; Kike 35'	Report	Torras 8'; Aicardo 12'; Wilde 17'; Paco Sedano 21'; Sergio Lozano 39'; Lin 39'	Stadium: Palacio de Deportes; Attendance: 7,000; Referee: Gracia Marín, Munez Carpintero

==== 4th leg ====
June 21, 2013	FC Barcelona Alusport	3–3 (a.e.t.) (5–3 p)	ElPozo Murcia	Barcelona
22:00 (UTC+2)	Fernandão 12'; Sergio Lozano 24'; Aicardo 35'	Report	Gréllo 1'; Paulinho 5'; Miguelín 25'	Stadium: Palau Blaugrana; Attendance: 6,479; Referee: Moreno Reina, Ramos Marín
	Penalties
	Wilde (penalty scored); Sergio Lozano (penalty scored); Lin (penalty scored); Ari (penalty scored); Torras (penalty scored)		(penalty scored) Lolo Suazo; (penalty scored) Gréllo; (penalty scored) Bebe; (penalty missed) José Ruiz

== Top scorers ==
Rank	Scorer	Club	Goals
1	(Spain) Dani Salgado	Marfil Santa Coloma	44
2	(Spain) Raúl Campos	Santiago	32
3	(Spain) Sergio Lozano	FC Barcelona Alusport	25
4	(Spain) Chicho	Umacon Zaragoza	24
5	(Spain) Miguelín	ElPozo Murcia	24
6	(Spain) Nano Modrego	Ríos Renovables R.N.	22
7	(Spain) Sergio	Caja Segovia	22
8	(Spain) Adolfo	Marfil Santa Coloma	21
9	(Spain) Rafa Usín	Triman Navarra	20
10	(Spain) Álex	ElPozo Murcia	19

== See also ==
- 2012–13 Segunda División de Futsal
- 2012–13 Copa del Rey de Futsal
- Futsal in Spain
