= 2013–14 Copa del Rey de Futsal =

2013–14 Copa del Rey
Tournament details
- Country: Spain
- Teams: 39

Final positions
- Champions: FC Barcelona Alusport
- Runners-up: ElPozo Murcia

Tournament statistics
- Matches played: 38
- Goals scored: 249 (6.55 per match)
- Top goal scorer: Wilde 7 goals

The 2013–14 Copa del Rey was the 4th staging of the Copa del Rey de Futsal. The competition began on October 8, 2013 with First round matches. The Final was played on 3 May at Bilbao Arena, Bilbao.

Barcelona Alusport won its fourth Copa del Rey title after defeating ElPozo Murcia 4–3 in the Final held in Bilbao, and remains as the only winners of Copa del Rey since its inception in 2010–11 season.

== Calendar ==
Round	Date	Fixtures	Clubs	Notes
First round	8/9/12 October 2013	5	10 → 32	10 teams from Segunda División B gain entry.
Round of 32	3–6 November 2013	16	32 → 16	Primera División and Segunda División's teams gain entry.
Round of 16	10–12/18 December 2013	8	16 → 8	
Quarter-finals	18/19 February 2014	4	8 → 4	
Semifinals	31 March 2014	4	4 → 2	
Semifinals	7/8 April 2014	4	4 → 2	
Final	3 May 2014	1	2 → 1	

== Qualified teams ==
- 15 clubs of Primera División
- 10 clubs of Segunda División
- 13 clubs of Segunda División B

== First round ==
Draw was held on Friday, August 30. Matches to be played on 8/9 and 12 October 2013.

All times are CEST.

Team 1	Score	Team 2
Gomera (Canary Islands)	4–0	(Canary Islands) Las Cuevecitas
Noia (Galicia (Spain))	4–2	(Galicia (Spain)) Cidade de Narón
Zierbena (Basque Country (autonomous community))	3–2	(Basque Country (autonomous community)) Concepto Egile
Escola Pia (Catalonia)	1–4	(Catalonia) Montcada
Carnicer Torrejón (Community of Madrid)	9–8	(Castilla–La Mancha) Massey Ferguson

=== Matches ===
October 8, 2013	Carnicer Torrejón	9–8 (a.e.t.)	Massey Ferguson	Torrejón de Ardoz
20:30 (UTC+2)	Caio Alves 6', 33', 50'; Antonio Parejo 10'; José Carlos 11'; Jorge Salcedo 20'; Sergio Luna 25', 42'; Chino 49'	Report	Fer 13', 14'; Joan Linares 19', 33', 44'; Kikillo 37'; Dani Colorado 40', 50'	Stadium: Pabellón Jorge Garbajosa; Attendance: 400; Referee: Aragón González, Pérez Pérez

October 8, 2013	Escola Pia	1–4	Montcada	Sabadell
21:15 (UTC+2)	Torras 37'	Report	Roger Bonet 14'; Gerard Esteller 27'; Carlitos Riquelme 33'; Pol 39'	Stadium: Pavelló de la Escola Pia

October 9, 2013	Zierbena	3–2 (a.e.t.)	Concepto Egile	Zierbena
20:00 (UTC+2)	Joseba 38'; Rober 45', 50'	Report	Javi Azcoiti 6'; Fino 43'	Stadium: Polideportivo Municipal

October 9, 2013	Noia	4–2	Cidade de Narón	Noia
21:00 (UTC+2)	Quique 1', 19', 28'; Oscarín 29'	Report	Adrián 12' (o.g.); Buján 29'	Stadium: Pavillón Municipal; Attendance: 200; Referee: Raquel Manteiga, José M. Carreira

October 12, 2013	Gomera	4–0	Las Cuevecitas	La Gomera
12:00 (UTC+1)	Lucas 15'; Rubén 20'; Edu Herrera 25'; Nando 31'	Report		Stadium: Pabellón del IES San Sebastián

Teams qualified to next round
Carnicer Torrejón	Montcada	Zierbena	Noia	Gomera

== Round of 32 ==
Draw took place on October 16 at 12:00 at RFEF headquarters. Round of 32 draw includes the five winners from the first round plus all Primera División and Segunda División teams.

Matches to be played from 3 to 6 November 2013.

Team 1	Score	Team 2
Carnicer Torrejón (Community of Madrid)	2–8	(Region of Murcia) ElPozo Murcia
Uruguay–Tenerife (Canary Islands)	1–2	(Navarre) Ríos Renovables R.N.
Zierbena (Basque Country (autonomous community))	3–3 (a.e.t.) (7–6p)	(Valencian Community) Peñíscola Bodegas Dunviro
Gomera (Canary Islands)	1–9	(Catalonia) FC Barcelona Alusport
Segovia Futsal (Castile and León)	3–2	(Galicia (Spain)) Santiago Futsal
Brihuega (Castilla–La Mancha)	3–5 (a.e.t.)	(Region of Murcia) Montesinos Jumilla
Melilla	1–2 (a.e.t.)	(Galicia (Spain)) Burela Pescados Rubén
Montcada (Catalonia)	3–1	(Navarre) Magna Navarra
Ategua (Andalusia)	0–4	(Community of Madrid) Inter Movistar
Noia (Galicia (Spain))	5–4 (a.e.t.)	(Catalonia) Marfil Santa Coloma
Plásticos Romero (Region of Murcia)	4–1	(Andalusia) Jaén Paraíso Interior
Hércules San Vicente (Valencian Community)	4–2	(Canary Islands) Colegios Arenas G.C.
O'Parrulo (Galicia (Spain))	2–6	(Balearic Islands) Hospital de Llevant
Profiltek Agüimes (Canary Islands)	0–5	(Galicia (Spain)) Azkar Lugo
L'Hospitalet Bellsport (Catalonia)	4–4 (a.e.t.) (1–4p)	(Aragon) Umacon Zaragoza
Real Betis FSN (Andalusia)	4–6	(Valencian Community) Levante UD DM

=== Matches ===
November 3, 2013	Hércules San Vicente	4–2	Colegios Arenas G.C.	San Vicente del Raspeig
17:45 (UTC+1)	Carri 9', 39'; Álex 19'; Reda 32'	Report	Yeray 9', 35' (pen.)	Stadium: Polideportivo Municipal; Attendance: 500; Referee: Rabadán Sainz, Sánchez Ayala

November 4, 2013	Plásticos Romero	4–1	Jaén Paraíso Interior	Cartagena
21:00 (UTC+1)	Javi Matía 12', 14'; Enrique 19', 40'	Report	Juan Puertas 36'	Stadium: Pabellón Wsell de Guimbarda; Attendance: 300; Referee: Fortes Pardo, Martínez Flores

November 5, 2013	Profiltek Agüimes	0–5	Azkar Lugo	Agüimes
20:30 (UTC±00)		Report	Iago Rodríguez 1'; Cospe 2', 6'; Chano 18', 21'	Stadium: Pabellón Municipal; Attendance: 500; Referee: Díaz Rodríguez, Díaz Rodríguez

November 5, 2013	Ategua	0–4	Inter Movistar	Castro del Río
20:45 (UTC+1)		Report	Batería 6', 39'; Rivillos 11', 35'	Stadium: Pabellón Municipal; Attendance: 800; Referee: Ramos Marín, Moreno Reina

November 5, 2013	L'Hospitalet Bellsport	4–4 (a.e.t.) (1–4 p)	Umacon Zaragoza	L'Hospitalet de Llobregat
20:45 (UTC+1)	Pau López 12', 37'; Álex Verdejo 23'; Guille 47'	Report	Retamar 5', 48'; Richi Felipe 8'; Catela 16'	Stadium: Poliesportiu Municipal "Sergio Manzano"; Referee: Bel Pascual, García Donas
	Penalties
	Pau López (penalty scored); Carles (penalty missed); Guille (penalty missed)		(penalty scored) Retamar; (penalty scored) Kiky; (penalty scored) Sato; (penalty scored) Edu Duato

November 5, 2013	Real Betis FSN	4–6	Levante UD DM	Dos Hermanas
20:45 (UTC+1)	Aarón 2'; Elías 18', 28'; Miguel 35'	Report	Jordi Lledó 20', 36'; Sena 25'; Álex Oviaño 30'; Márquez 38', 39'	Stadium: Pabellón Francisco de Dios Jiménez; Referee: Cotes García, Elena Pedrós

November 5, 2013	Gomera	1–9	FC Barcelona Alusport	Santa Cruz de Tenerife
21:00 (UTC±00)	Lucas 33'	Report	Wilde 1', 9', 32'; Igor 2', 10', 22'; Gabriel 13'; Jordi Torras 15'; Saad 18'	Stadium: Pabellón Central; Attendance: 2,000; Referee: Delgado Indalecio, Mamolar Calvo

November 5, 2013	Melilla	1–2 (a.e.t.)	Burela Pescados Rubén	Melilla
21:00 (UTC+1)	Antoñito 30' (o.g.)	Report	Iago Míguez 16'; Antoñito 43'	Stadium: Pabellón Javier Imbroda Ortiz; Attendance: 350; Referee: Cordero Gallardo, Linares López

November 5, 2013	Noia	5–4 (a.e.t.)	Marfil Santa Coloma	Noia
21:00 (UTC+1)	Álex 9'; Marci 23'; Diego Pernas 26'; Romario 35'; Oscarín 49'	Report	Adolfo 1', 32'; Rafa López 18'; Panocha 34'	Stadium: Pavillón Municipal; Attendance: 700; Referee: Cid Bragado, González Armada

November 5, 2013	Montcada	3–1	Magna Navarra	Montcada i Reixac
21:15 (UTC+1)	Gerard Esteller 3', 16'; Jordi Marty 8'	Report	Javi Saldise 14'	Stadium: Pavelló Municipal Miquel Poblet; Attendance: 600; Referee: Centeno Bono, Moreno Millán

November 6, 2013	O'Parrulo	2–6	Hospital de Llevant	Ferrol
20:00 (UTC+1)	Jacobo 17'; Víctor 27'	Report	Vadillo 15', 34'; A. Vega 30'; Chicho 35', 39'; Joselito 35'	Stadium: Pavillón A Malata; Attendance: 150; Referee: Gallo Suárez, Velasco Martínez

November 6, 2013	Zierbena	3–3 (a.e.t.) (7–6 p)	Peñíscola Bodegas Dunviro	Zierbena
20:00 (UTC+1)	Rober 11', 20'; Joseba 47'	Report	Contreras 9', 33'; Diego Blanco 42'	Stadium: Polideportivo Municipal; Referee: Arce Ruiz, De Juana González

November 6, 2013	Brihuega	3–5 (a.e.t.)	Montesinos Jumilla	Brihuega
20:30 (UTC+1)	Julito 19'; Cristian Romera 32'; Charly 40'	Report	Rubén Zamora 21', 30'; Pichi 36'; Pepe 43' (o.g.); Chino 50'	Stadium: Polideportivo Virgen de la Peña; Referee: Martínez Segovia, Sánchez Molina

November 6, 2013	Carnicer Torrejón	2–8	ElPozo Murcia	Torrejón de Ardoz
20:30 (UTC+1)	Caio 6' (pen.); Chino 36'	Report	Adri 7', 15'; Gréllo 11', 11'; Álex 35', 35'; Javaloy 38'; Juampi 39'	Stadium: Pabellón Jorge Garbajosa; Referee: Gutiérrez Lumbreras, Lope Díaz

November 6, 2013	Segovia Futsal	3–2	Santiago Futsal	Segovia
20:30 (UTC+1)	Castilla 2'; Ángel Bingyoba 13'; Javi Alonso 24'	Report	Ángel Bingyoba 3' (o.g.); Palomeque 29'	Stadium: Pabellón Pedro Delgado; Attendance: 700; Referee: Contreras Tejedor, Viedma Martín

November 6, 2013	Uruguay–Tenerife	1–2	Ríos Renovables R.N.	Santa Cruz de Tenerife
20:30 (UTC±00)	Carlos Corvo 6'	Report	Andresito 10'; Palmas 29'	Stadium: Pabellón Central; Attendance: 500; Referee: García Hernández, Mendoza Martínez

Teams qualified to next round
Hércules San Vicente	Plásticos Romero	Azkar Lugo	Inter Movistar	Umacon Zaragoza	Levante UD DM	FC Barcelona Alusport	Burela Pescados Rubén
Noia	Montcada	Hospital de Llevant	Zierbena	Montesinos Jumilla	ElPozo Murcia	Segovia Futsal	Ríos Renovables R.N.

== Round of 16 ==
Round of 16 draw took place on November 13 at RFEF headquarters. This round draw includes the 16 winners from the Round of 32 which in summary are nine teams from Primera División, four from Segunda División and three from Segunda División B.

Matches to be played on 10/11/12 and 18 December 2013.

All times are CET.

Team 1	Score	Team 2
Segovia Futsal (Castile and León)	0–7	(Region of Murcia) Montesinos Jumilla
Zierbena (Basque Country (autonomous community))	4–5	(Balearic Islands) Hospital de Llevant
Hércules San Vicente (Valencian Community)	2–4	(Region of Murcia) ElPozo Murcia
Plásticos Romero (Region of Murcia)	0–5	(Galicia (Spain)) Azkar Lugo
Montcada (Catalonia)	1–7	(Aragon) Umacon Zaragoza
Levante UD DM (Valencian Community)	2–4	(Galicia (Spain)) Burela Pescados Rubén
Noia (Galicia (Spain))	0–5	(Navarre) Ríos Renovables R.N.
FC Barcelona Alusport (Catalonia)	4–3 (a.e.t.)	(Community of Madrid) Inter Movistar

=== Matches ===
December 10, 2013	Zierbena	4–5	Hospital de Llevant	Zierbena
20:00 (UTC+1)	Joseba 5', 36', 39'; Rober 24'	Report	Vadillo 23'; A. Vega 28'; João 30'; Joselito 33'; Bruno Taffy 35'	Stadium: Polideportivo Municipal; Referee: Felipe Madorrán, Gereta Ramírez

December 10, 2013	Noia	0–5	Ríos Renovables R.N.	Noia
21:00 (UTC+1)		Report	David 17', 37'; Andresito 19'; Joselito 32'; Charlie 35'	Stadium: Pavillón Municipal; Attendance: 850; Referee: Cid Bragado, González Armada

December 10, 2013	Plásticos Romero	0–5	Azkar Lugo	Cartagena
21:00 (UTC+1)		Report	Antonio Diz 14'; Chano 36', 40'; Aranburu 38'; Diego Núñez 40'	Stadium: Pabellón Wsell de Guimbarda; Attendance: 200; Referee: González Ruano, Rabadán Sainz

December 11, 2013	Hércules San Vicente	2–4	ElPozo Murcia	Alicante
21:00 (UTC+1)	Pipi 14'; Álex 25'	Report	Gréllo 1'; José Ruiz 18'; Álex 27'; Bebe 34'	Stadium: Pabellón Pitiu Rochel; Attendance: 1,500; Referee: Bernabéu Haro, Sánchez Ayala

December 11, 2013	Montcada	1–7	Umacon Zaragoza	Montcada i Reixac
21:15 (UTC+1)	Chechi 20'	Report	Retamar 12', 40'; Sato 15'; Tejel 16'; Sampedro 34'; C. Amores 40'; Álvaro Nieto 40'	Stadium: Pavelló Municipal Miquel Poblet; Referee: Bel Pascual, García Donas

December 12, 2013	FC Barcelona Alusport	4–3 (a.e.t.)	Inter Movistar	Barcelona
21:00 (UTC+1)	Lin 11'; Aicardo 14'; Fernandão 22'; Wilde 43'	Report	Batería 1', 3'; Ortiz 18'	Stadium: Palau Blaugrana; Attendance: 2,808; Referee: Alonso Montesinos, Santander Flamarique

December 18, 2013	Levante UD DM	2–4	Burela Pescados Rubén	Valencia
20:30 (UTC+1)	Jordi Lledó 5', 38'	Report	Antoñito 22', 24'; Matamoros 24'; David 40'	Stadium: Pavelló Poliesportiu El Cabanyal; Attendance: 700; Referee: Fortes Pardo, Martínez Flores

December 18, 2013	Segovia Futsal	0–7	Montesinos Jumilla	Segovia
20:30 (UTC+1)		Report	Pichí 4', 27', 30', 30'; Rubén Zamora 9', 24'; Chino 35'	Stadium: Pabellón Pedro Delgado; Referee: Del Pozo García, López Jiménez

Teams qualified to next round
Hospital de Llevant	Ríos Renovables R.N.	Azkar Lugo	ElPozo Murcia
Umacon Zaragoza	FC Barcelona Alusport	Burela Pescados Rubén	Montesinos Jumilla

== Final stages ==
Quarter-finals
Burela Pescados Rubén	2
Ríos Renovables R.N.	3
Azkar Lugo	1
ElPozo Murcia	5
Umacon Zaragoza	5
Montesinos Jumilla	3
FC Barcelona Alusport	4
Hospital de Llevant Manacor	2

Semi-finals
Ríos Renovables R.N.	1	1	2
ElPozo Murcia	5	0	5
Umacon Zaragoza	2	2	4
FC Barcelona Alusport	6	6	12

Final
ElPozo Murcia	3
FC Barcelona Alusport	4

=== Quarter finals ===
Quarter-finals draw took place on December 19, 2013, at the RFEF headquarters.

Matches to be played on 18 and 19 February 2014.

All times are CET.

Team 1	Score	Team 2
Burela Pescados Rubén (Galicia (Spain))	2–3	(Navarre) Ríos Renovables R.N.
Azkar Lugo (Galicia (Spain))	1–5	(Region of Murcia) ElPozo Murcia
Umacon Zaragoza (Aragon)	5–3	(Region of Murcia) Montesinos Jumilla
FC Barcelona Alusport (Catalonia)	4–2	(Balearic Islands) Hospital de Llevant Manacor

==== Matches ====
February 18, 2014	Burela Pescados Rubén	2–3	Ríos Renovables R.N.	Burela
20:30 (UTC+1)	Matamoros 19', 40'	Report	Joselito 28'; Luisma 28'; Rubi 39'	Stadium: Pabellón Vista Alegre; Attendance: 700; Referee: Gallo Suárez, Velasco Martínez

February 18, 2014	Umacon Zaragoza	5–3	Montesinos Jumilla	Zaragoza
20:30 (UTC+1)	Keny 8', 36'; Richi Felipe 13'; Catela 27'; Retamar 28'	Report	Rober 3'; Lolo Suazo 32'; Rubén Zamora 34'	Stadium: Pabellón Siglo XXI; Attendance: 400; Referee: Felipe Madorrán, Gereta Ramírez

February 18, 2014	Azkar Lugo	1–5	ElPozo Murcia	Lugo
21:00 (UTC+1)	Aranburu 6'	Report	Juampi 11'; Eka 12'; Raúl Campos 20', 39'; Kike 37'	Stadium: Pabellón Municipal; Attendance: 500; Referee: Contreras Tejedor, Pérez Álvarez

February 19, 2014	FC Barcelona Alusport	4–2	Hospital de Llevant	Barcelona
20:45 (UTC+1)	Saad 2'; Fernandão 16'; Wilde 18'; Sergio Lozano 40'	Report	Tomaz 7'; Chicho 33'	Stadium: Palau Blaugrana; Attendance: 1,644; Referee: Alonso Montesinos, Santander Flamarique

Teams qualified to next round
Ríos Renovables R.N.	Umacon Zaragoza
ElPozo Murcia	FC Barcelona Alusport

=== Semi finals ===
First leg matches to be played on 31 March and second leg matches on 7/8 April.

All times are CEST.

Team 1	Agg.	Team 2	1st leg	2nd leg
Ríos Renovables R.N. (Navarre)	2–5	(Region of Murcia) ElPozo Murcia	1–5	1–0
Umacon Zaragoza (Aragon)	4–12	(Catalonia) FC Barcelona Alusport	2–6	2–6

==== Matches ====
===== 1st leg =====
March 31, 2014	Ríos Renovables R.N.	1–5	ElPozo Murcia	Tudela
20:30 (UTC+2)	Joselito 6'	Report	Raúl Campos 13', 40'; Juampi 32'; Eka 38'; Franklin 39'	Stadium: Polideportivo Ciudad de Tudela; Attendance: 1,000; Referee: Alonso Montesinos, Santander Flamarique

March 31, 2014	Umacon Zaragoza	2–6	FC Barcelona Alusport	Zaragoza
20:30 (UTC+2)	Víctor Tejel 19'; Richi Felipe 22'	Report	Wilde 3'; Igor 15'; Sergio Lozano 27'; Dyego 29'; Saad 31'; Lin 37'	Stadium: Pabellón Siglo XXI; Attendance: 800; Referee: Sanzol Goñi, Urdanoz Apezteguia

===== 2nd leg =====
7 April 2014	ElPozo Murcia	0–1 (5–2 agg.)	Ríos Renovables R.N.	Murcia
21:00 (UTC+2)		Report	Charlie 24'	Stadium: Palacio de Deportes; Attendance: 2,000; Referee: González Ruano, Rabadán Sainz

8 April 2014	FC Barcelona Alusport	6–2 (12–4 agg.)	Umacon Zaragoza	Barcelona
20:45 (UTC+2)	Ortego 6', 18'; Wilde 14'; Torras 24', 27'; Roger 40'	Report	Richi Felipe 12'; E Duato 39'	Stadium: Palau Blaugrana; Attendance: 1,000; Referee: Fortes Pardo, Martínez Flores

Teams qualified to Final
ElPozo Murcia	FC Barcelona Alusport

=== Final ===
The final took place on 3 May at the Bilbao Arena in Bilbao, Basque Country.

May 3, 2014	FC Barcelona Alusport	4–3 (a.e.t.)	ElPozo Murcia	Bilbao
20:00 (UTC+2)	Aicardo 22'; Igor 28'; Sergio Lozano 40'; Fernandão 49'	Report	José Ruiz 11'; Franklin 27'; Eka 37'	Stadium: Bilbao Arena; Attendance: 5,000; Referee: Gracia Marín, Múnez Carpintero

2013–14 Copa del Rey de Futsal winners
(Catalonia)
FC Barcelona Alusport
Fourth title

== Top goalscorers ==
Last updated: 3 May. Players in bold are still active in the competition.

Rank	Player	Club	R1	R2	R3	QF	SF1	SF2	F	Total
1
1	(Brazil) **Wilde**	FC Barcelona Alusport	–	3	1	1	1	1		7
2
2	(Brazil) **Igor**	FC Barcelona Alusport	–	3	0	0	0	0	1	5
2	(Spain) Joseba	Zierbena	1	1	3					5
2	(Spain) Pichí	Montesinos Jumilla		1	4					5
2	(Spain) Rober	Zierbena	2	2	1					5
2	(Spain) Retamar	Umacon Zaragoza		2	2	1				5
2	(Spain) Rubén Zamora	Montesinos Jumilla		2	2	1				5

Source: own compilation

== See also ==
- 2013–14 Primera División de Futsal
- 2013 Copa de España de Futsal
