= 2013–14 Primera División de Futsal =

Primera División
- Season: 2013–14
- Champions: Inter Movistar
- Relegated: Colegios Arenas G.C.
- UEFA Futsal Cup: Inter Movistar & FC Barcelona Alusport
- Matches: 154
- Goals: 986 (6.4 per match)
- Top goalscorer: Dani Salgado (Marfil Santa Coloma) – 34 goals
- Biggest home win: Inter Movistar 11–2 Hospital Llevant
- Biggest away win: Santiago 0–7 Inter Movistar
- Highest scoring: Marfil Santa Coloma 8–7 Montesinos Jumilla

The 2013–14 season of the Primera División de Fútbol Sala is the 25th season of top-tier futsal in Spain. It is the third season under the "Primera División" name. The regular season started on September 12, 2013, and will conclude on April 26, 2014. The championship playoffs will follow the end of the regular season.

Barcelona Alusport are the defending champions by defeating ElPozo Murcia 3–1 in the 2012–13 Championship Final series.

Caja Segovia, for financial reasons, and Puertollano, by finishing in last place, were relegated at the end of the 2012–2013 regular season. Montesinos Jumilla, Peñíscola Bodegas Dunviro, and Jaén Paraíso Interior were promoted from the Segunda División de Futsal for the 2013–2014 season.

At the end of the regular season the top eight teams will play in the championship playoffs.

Inter Movistar became champions by defeating ElPozo Murcia 3–1 in the Final series, winning its overall ninth title and first since 2008.

== Teams ==
=== Personnel and kits ===
Team	Location	Manager	Kit manufacturer	Shirt sponsor
FC Barcelona Alusport	Barcelona	Marc Carmona	Nike	Alusport
ElPozo Murcia	Murcia	"Duda"	Kelme	ElPozo
Inter Movistar	Alcalá de Henares	Jesús Velasco	Joma	Movistar
Umacon Zaragoza	Zaragoza	Jorge Sampedro	Kelme	Umacon
Triman Navarra	Pamplona	Imanol Arregui	Lotto	Magna
Santiago	Santiago de Compostela	Santiago Valladares	Kelme	No shirt sponsor
Ríos Renovables R.N.	Tudela	"Pato"	Kelme	Ríos Renovables
Marfil Santa Coloma	Santa Coloma	Xavi Passarrius	Kelme	Marfil Alella
Azkar Lugo	Lugo	Diego Ríos	Lotto	Azkar
Hospital de Llevant	Manacor	Tomás de Dios	Macron	Hospital de Llevant
Burela Pescados Rubén	Burela	Juan Luis Alonso	Joma	Pescados Rubén
Colegios Arenas Gáldar	Gáldar	Suso Méndez	Zeus	Colegios Arenas
Montesinos Jumilla	Jumilla	Juan Francisco Gea	Elements	Central Quesera Montesinos
Peñíscola Bodegas Dunviro	Peñíscola	Carlos Sánchez	Rasán	Bodegas Dunviro
Jaén Paraíso Interior	Jaén	Daniel Rodríguez	Joma	Jaén, Paraíso Interior

=== Stadia and locations ===
Location of teams in Primera División 2013–14
Canary Islands

Team	Location	Stadium	Capacity
FC Barcelona Alusport	Barcelona	Palau Blaugrana	7,500
ElPozo Murcia	Murcia	Palacio de Deportes	7,500
Inter Movistar	Alcalá de Henares	Pabellón Caja Madrid	4,500
Umacon Zaragoza	Zaragoza	Pabellón Siglo XXI	2,500
Magna Navarra	Pamplona	Pabellón Universitario	3,000
Santiago	Santiago de Compostela	Fontes do Sar	6,000
Ríos Renovables R.N.	Tudela	Ciudad de Tudela	1,200
Marfil Santa Coloma	Santa Coloma de Gramenet	Jacint Verdaguer	2,500
Azkar Lugo	Lugo	Pabellón Municipal	2,300
Hospital de Llevant	Manacor	Son Moix	4,116
Burela Pescados Rubén	Burela	Vista Alegre	1,040
Colegios Arenas G.C.	Gáldar	Centro Insular	5,000
Montesinos Jumilla	Jumilla	Carlos García Ruiz	1,000
Peñíscola Bodegas Dunviro	Peñíscola	Pabellón Municipal	2,000
Jaén Paraíso Interior	Jaén	La Salobreja	1,200

== Regular season table ==
	Team	Pld	W	D	L	GF	GA	GD	Pts
1	Inter Movistar	28	25	1	2	148	58	69	76
2	ElPozo Murcia	28	22	2	4	139	69	51	68
3	FC Barcelona Alusport	28	21	5	2	115	46	47	68
4	Marfil Santa Coloma	28	15	5	8	115	98	18	50
5	Magna Navarra	28	14	2	12	101	101	0	44
6	Montesinos Jumilla	28	12	5	11	90	92	−2	41
7	Burela Pescados Rubén	28	11	7	10	77	80	−3	40
8	Ríos Renovables R.N.	28	11	6	11	75	80	−5	39
9	Santiago	28	10	7	11	76	79	−3	37
10	Jaén Paraíso Interior	28	7	6	15	59	83	−24	27
11	Hospital de Llevant	28	7	5	16	87	117	−30	26
12	Peñíscola Bodegas Dunviro	28	5	10	13	57	91	−34	25
13	Azkar Lugo	28	6	4	18	72	113	−41	22
14	Umacon Zaragoza	28	5	5	18	77	114	−37	20
15	Colegios Arenas G.C.	28	3	2	23	68	135	−67	11

Source: lnfs.es

Championship playoffs
Relegation to Segunda División

== Championship playoffs ==
=== Calendar ===
Round	Date	Fixtures	Clubs	Notes
Quarter-finals	10/17/18 May 2014	8	8 → 4	
Semifinals	24/31 May, 1 June 2014	4	4 → 2	
Final	7/8/14/15/18 June 2014	3	2 → 1	

=== Bracket ===
Quarter-finals
1	Inter Movistar	5	7
8	Ríos Renovables R.N.	2	1
4	Marfil Santa Coloma	6	6
5	Magna Navarra	3	3
2	ElPozo Murcia	8	3	10
7	Burela Pescados Rubén	3	4	1
3	FC Barcelona Alusport	5	9
6	Montesinos Jumilla	3	2

Semifinals
1	Inter Movistar	4	8
4	Marfil Santa Coloma	0	1
2	ElPozo Murcia	1	2	1
3	FC Barcelona Alusport	4	0	0

Final
1	Inter Movistar	4	4	4
2	ElPozo Murcia	3	1	2

2013–14 Primera División winners
(Community of Madrid)
Inter Movistar
Ninth title

=== Quarter-finals ===
==== 1st leg ====
May 9, 2014	Magna Navarra	3–6	Marfil Santa Coloma	Pamplona
20:30 (UTC+2)	Rafa Usín 10', 29'; Carlitos 20'	Report	Rafa Usín 1' (o.g.); Martel 15'; Sepe 29', 34'; Adolfo 39', 40'	Stadium: Pabellón Anaitasuna; Attendance: 600; Referee: Del Pozo García, Lopez Jiménez

May 9, 2014	Montesinos Jumilla	3–5	FC Barcelona Alusport	Jumilla
21:15 (UTC+2)	Lolo Suazo 15'; Chino 36'; Pizarro 37'	Report	Fernandão 25'; Rober 27' (o.g.); Sergio Lozano 28'; Lin 34'; Saad 38'	Stadium: Carlos García Ruiz; Attendance: 1,000; Referee: Martínez Segovia, Sánchez Molina

May 10, 2014	Burela Pescados Rubén	3–8	ElPozo Murcia	Burela
13:00 (UTC+2)	Matamoros 7', 26'; Juanma 17'	Report	Bebe 5'; Raúl Campos 6', 26'; Adri 9'; Gréllo 18', 40'; José Ruiz 20'; Franklin 21'	Stadium: Vista Alegre; Attendance: 1,100; Referee: Gallo Suárez, Velasco Martínez

May 10, 2014	Ríos Renovables R.N.	2–5	Inter Movistar	Tudela
18:30 (UTC+2)	Andresito 15'; Charlie 35'	Report	Batería 17'; Rivillos 22'; Tobe 23'; Cardinal 31'; Rafael 33'	Stadium: Ciudad de Tudela; Referee: Felipe Madorrán, Gereta Ramírez

==== 2nd leg ====
May 16, 2014	ElPozo Murcia	3–4	Burela Pescados Rubén	Murcia
21:00 (UTC+2)	Franklin 10'; Adri 35'; Kike 38'	Report	Matamoros 11'; Iago Míguez 27'; Christian 34'; Adri 34' (o.g.)	Stadium: Palacio de Deportes; Attendance: 3,500; Referee: Cuesta Sánchez, García Morón

May 16, 2014	Inter Movistar	7–1	Ríos Renovables R.N.	Alcalá de Henares
21:00 (UTC+2)	Tobe 6', 40'; Pola 27'; Ortiz 29'; Ricardinho 30'; Borja 34'; Rivillos 38'	Report	Lolo 39'	Stadium: Pabellón Caja Madrid; Attendance: 3,500; Referee: Cid Bragado, Martínez Torres

May 17, 2014	FC Barcelona Alusport	9–2	Montesinos Jumilla	Barcelona
13:00 (UTC+2)	Fernandão 3'; Sergio Lozano 6', 14'; Ortego 7', 22'; Wilde 13', 30'; Aicardo 33'; Dyego 34'	Report	Pizarro 28', 29'	Stadium: Palau Blaugrana; Attendance: 2,122; Referee: Díaz Rodríguez, García Hernández

May 17, 2014	Marfil Santa Coloma	6–3	Magna Navarra	Santa Coloma de Gramenet
13:00 (UTC+2)	Adolfo 7', 38', 40'; A Segura 8'; J Sánchez 17'; Rubén 18'	Report	Eseverri 2'; Jesulito 5'; Rafa Usín 14'	Stadium: Jacint Verdaguer; Attendance: 1,800; Referee: Gutiérrez Lumbreras, Lope Díaz

==== 3rd leg ====
May 18, 2014	ElPozo Murcia	10–1	Burela Pescados Rubén	Murcia
12:00 (UTC+2)	Eka 4'; Raúl Campos 5', 23'; José Ruiz 10'; Juampi 14'; Gréllo 19'; Franklin 21'; Bebe 28', 30'; Jesús 35'	Report	Matamoros 4'	Stadium: Palacio de Deportes; Attendance: 3,000; Referee: González Ruano, Rabadán Sáinz

=== Semifinals ===
==== 1st leg ====
May 23, 2014	FC Barcelona Alusport	4–1	ElPozo Murcia	Barcelona
21:30 (UTC+2)	Fernandão 10'; Wilde 25', 39'; Torras 27'	Report	Raúl Campos 4'	Stadium: Palau Blaugrana; Attendance: 4,081; Referee: Gracia Marín, Munez Carpintero

May 24, 2014	Marfil Santa Coloma	0–4	Inter Movistar	Santa Coloma de Gramenet
13:00 (UTC+2)		Report	Batería 3'; Rivillos 36'; Rafael 36', 38'	Stadium: Jacint Verdaguer; Referee: Sanzol Goñi, Urdánoz Apezteguía

==== 2nd leg ====
May 30, 2014	Inter Movistar	8–1	Marfil Santa Coloma	Alcalá de Henares
21:00 (UTC+2)	Rafael 2'; Rivillos 4'; Cardinal 6', 24'; Borja 16'; Ortiz 30'; Nano Modrego 31'; Murga 38'	Report	A Segura 21'	Stadium: Pabellón Caja Madrid; Attendance: 3,900; Referee: Fortes Pardo, Martínez Flores

Inter Movistar wins series 2–0 and advance to Final.

May 31, 2014	ElPozo Murcia	2–0	FC Barcelona Alusport	Murcia
13:00 (UTC+2)	Franklin 33'; Gréllo 39'	Report		Stadium: Palacio de Deportes; Attendance: 5,500; Referee: Gutiérrez Lumbreras, Lope Díaz

==== 3rd leg ====
June 1, 2014	ElPozo Murcia	1–0	FC Barcelona Alusport	Murcia
19:00 (UTC+2)	Raúl Campos 23'	Report		Stadium: Palacio de Deportes; Attendance: 6,500; Referee: Moreno Reina, Ramos Marín

ElPozo Murcia won series 2–1 and advanced to Final.

=== Final ===
==== 1st leg ====
June 7, 2014	Inter Movistar	4–3 (a.e.t.)	ElPozo Murcia	Alcalá de Henares
13:00 (UTC+2)	Ricardinho 12'; Batería 14', 43'; Cardinal 35'	Report	Álex 18', 23', 27'	Stadium: Pabellón Caja Madrid; Attendance: 4,200; Referee: Díaz Rodríguez, García Hernández

==== 2nd leg ====
June 8, 2014	Inter Movistar	4–1	ElPozo Murcia	Alcalá de Henares
17:00 (UTC+2)	Ricardinho 1'; Rafael 13', 29', 40'	Report	Bebe 29'	Stadium: Pabellón Caja Madrid; Attendance: 4,200; Referee: Felipe Madorrán, Gereta Ramírez

==== 3rd leg ====
June 14, 2014	ElPozo Murcia	2–4	Inter Movistar	Murcia
13:00 (UTC+2)	Kike 8'; Rafael 23' (o.g.)	Report	Borja 16'; Batería 28'; Nano Modrego 39'; Rafael 40'	Stadium: Palacio de Deportes; Attendance: 5,000; Referee: Cuesta Sánchez, García Morón

== Top scorers ==
Regular season only

#	Player	Club	Goals
1	(Spain) Dani Salgado	Marfil Santa Coloma	34
2	(Brazil) Bruno Taffy	Hospital de Llevant Manacor	26
3	(Spain) Andresito	Ríos Renovables R.N.	24
3	(Spain) Matamoros	Burela Pescados Rubén	24
3	(Spain) Raúl Campos	ElPozo Murcia	24

== See also ==
- 2013–14 Segunda División de Futsal
- 2013–14 Copa del Rey de Futsal
- Futsal in Spain
