= 2010–11 División de Honor de Futsal =

División de Honor
- Season: 2010–11
- Champions: Barcelona Alusport
- Relegated: Playas de Castellón & Gestesa Guadalajara
- Matches: 240
- Goals: 1,564 (6.52 per match)
- Top goalscorer: Betao (Inter Movistar) – 36 goals
- Biggest home win: Barcelona Alusport 10–0 Gestesa Guadalajara
- Biggest away win: Gestesa Guadalajara 2–8 Inter Movistar
- Highest scoring: Reale Cartagena 10–9 ElPozo Murcia

The 2010–11 season of the División de Honor de Futbol Sala was the 22nd season of top-tier futsal in Spain. It was the last season under "División de Honor" name. From 2011 to 2012 season, the top division will be called Primera División.

== Teams ==
=== Personnel and kits ===
Team	Location	Manager	Kit manufacturer	Shirt sponsor
ElPozo Murcia	Murcia	"Duda"	Luanvi	ElPozo
Inter Movistar	Alcalá de Henares	David Marín	Joma	Movistar
Caja Segovia	Segovia	Jesús Velasco Tejada	Uhlsport	Caja Segovia
Xacobeo 2010 Lobelle	Santiago de Compostela	Tomás de Dios López	Macron	Xacobeo 2010
FC Barcelona Alusport	Barcelona	Marc Carmona	Nike	Alusport
Marfil Santa Coloma	Santa Coloma	Andreu Plaza	Macron	Marfil Alella
Triman Navarra	Pamplona	Imanol Arregui	Lotto	Triman
Carnicer Torrejón	Torrejón de Ardoz	José Antonio Valle	Luanvi	Fiat Carnicer
Azkar Lugo	Lugo	Bruno García	Lotto	Azkar
Gestesa Guadalajara	Guadalajara	Carlos Sánchez	Macron	Gestesa
Playas de Castellón	Castellón	Fran Torres	Umbro	Macer
Sala 10 Zaragoza	Zaragoza	Santi Amor	Joma	MLN, Ace Duraflo
Reale Cartagena	Cartagena	Luis Fonseca	Elements	Reale Seguros
Benicarló Aeroport Castelló	Benicarló	"Juanlu" Alonso	Uhlsport	Aeroport Castelló
OID Talavera	Talavera de la Reina	Carlos Sánchez	Joma	OID
Fisiomedia Manacor	Manacor	"Pato" Navarro	Umbro	Fisiomedia

=== Stadia and locations ===
Location of teams in División de Honor 2010–11

Team	Location	Stadium	Capacity
Azkar Lugo	Lugo	Pabellón Municipal de Lugo	2,300
Barcelona	Barcelona	Palau Blaugrana	7,500
Benicarló Aeroport Castelló	Benicarló	Pabellón de Benicarló	2,000
Caja Segovia	Segovia	Pabellón Pedro Delgado	2,800
Carnicer Torrejón	Torrejón de Ardoz	Pabellón Jorge Garbajosa	4,000
ElPozo Murcia Turística	Murcia	Palacio de Deportes de Murcia	7,500
Gestesa Guadalajara	Guadalajara	Palacio Multiusos	2,000
Inter Movistar	Alcalá de Henares	Pabellón Caja Madrid	4,500
Marfil Santa Coloma	Santa Coloma de Gramenet	Jacint Verdaguer	2,500
Navarra	Pamplona	Pabellón Universitario de Navarra	3,000
Playas de Castellón	Castellón de la Plana	Pabellón Ciutat de Castelló	4,500
Reale Cartagena	Cartagena	Pabellón Wsell de Guimbarda	2,500
Sala 10 Zaragoza	Zaragoza	Pabellón Siglo XXI	2,500
Xacobeo 2010 Lobelle Santiago	Santiago de Compostela	Pabellón Multiusos Fontes Do Sar	6,000
OID Talavera	Talavera de la Reina	Primero de Mayo	3.000
Fisiomedia Manacor	Manacor	Palma Arena	5.000

== League table ==
	Team	Pld	W	D	L	GF	GA	Pts
1	Barcelona Alusport	30	22	4	4	127	63	70
2	ElPozo Murcia	30	20	5	5	138	90	65
3	Inter Movistar	30	18	7	5	111	75	61
4	Xacobeo Lobelle	30	18	5	7	133	94	59
5	Fisiomedia Manacor	30	17	5	8	107	87	56
6	Caja Segovia	30	15	3	12	104	95	48
7	Benicarló Aeroport Castelló	30	14	2	14	82	78	44
8	Triman Navarra	30	12	6	12	100	96	42
9	Sala 10	30	12	4	14	93	91	40
10	Carnicer Torrejón	30	10	5	15	95	101	35
11	Azkar Lugo	30	10	5	15	98	105	35
12	OID Talavera	30	11	2	17	78	96	35
13	Reale Cartagena	30	9	7	14	102	116	34
14	Marfil Santa Coloma	30	8	6	16	82	102	30
15	Playas de Castellón	30	9	1	20	59	108	28
16	Gestesa Guadalajara	30	0	3	27	55	167	0

Gestesa Guadalajara, 3 points deducted

Source: Liga Nacional de Futbol Sala

Championship playoffs
Relegation playoff
Relegation to División de Plata

== Championship playoffs ==
quarter-finals
Fisiomedia Manacor	4	1	1
Xacobeo Lobelle Santiago	0	2	3
Triman Navarra	1	2	_
Barcelona Alusport	3	4	_
Benicarló Aeroport Castelló	7	1 (6)	_
ElPozo Murcia	2	1 (5)	_
Caja Segovia	2 (5)	4	4
Inter Movistar	2 (3)	7	2

semifinals
Xacobeo Lobelle Santiago	4	0	_
Barcelona Alusport	7	5	_
Benicarló Aeroport Castelló	2	3	_
Caja Segovia	3	4

final
Barcelona Alusport	2	4	4	2	3
Caja Segovia	3	2	1	4	2

2010–11 División de Honor winners
(Catalonia)
Barcelona Alusport
First title

=== Quarter-finals ===
==== First leg ====
May 13, 2011	Triman Navarra	1–3	Barcelona Alusport	Pamplona
21:00 (UTC+2)	Carlitos 38'	Report	12' Javi Rodríguez; 28' Fernandao; 40' Fernandao	Stadium: Pabellón Universitario; Attendance: 3,500; Referee: Gutiérrez Lumbreras & Lope Díaz

May 14, 2011	Benicarló Aeroport Castelló	7–2	ElPozo Murcia	Benicarló
18:00 (UTC+2)	Retamar 6'; Lolo 17'; Lolo 31'; Retamar 33'; Lolo 35'; Retamar 39'; Retamar 40'	Report	32' Kike; 37' Álvaro	Stadium: Pabellón Municipal; Attendance: 2,500; Referee: Blázquez Sierra & Gª Donas Salvador

May 14, 2011	Caja Segovia	2–2 (a.e.t.) (5–3 p)	Inter Movistar	Segovia
18:00 (UTC+2)	Tobe 7'; Antoñito 27'	Report	11' Betao; 13' Schumacher	Stadium: Pedro Delgado; Attendance: 2,500; Referee: Cordero Gallardo & Linares López
	Penalties
	Borja (penalty scored); Tobe (penalty scored); Matías (penalty scored); Sergio Lozano (penalty scored); Esquerdinha (penalty scored)		(penalty scored) Betao; (penalty scored) Eka; (penalty missed) Borja; (penalty scored) Marquinho

May 15, 2011	Fisiomedia Manacor	4–0	Xacobeo Lobelle	Palma de Mallorca
12:15 (UTC+2)	Joan Zapatillas 5'; Martín Amas 14'; José Ruiz 29'; José Ruiz 40'	Report		Stadium: Palma Arena; Attendance: 3,000; Referee: Lope Díaz & Rabadán Sáinz

==== Second leg ====
May 20, 2011	ElPozo Murcia	1–1 (a.e.t.) (5–6 p)	Benicarló Aeroport Castelló	Murcia
20:30 (UTC+2)	Kike 1'	Report	37' Chaguinha	Stadium: Palacio de Deportes; Attendance: 3,500; Referee: Peña Diaz & Peña Gómez
	Penalties
	Vinicius (penalty scored); Mauricio (penalty scored); De Bail (penalty scored); Saúl (penalty scored); Kike (penalty scored); Álex (penalty missed); Franklin (penalty missed)		(penalty scored) Vadillo; (penalty scored) Xapa; (penalty scored) Lolo; (penalty scored) Javi Alonso; (penalty scored) Chaguinha; (penalty missed) Chicho; (penalty scored) Gonzalo

May 20, 2011	Barcelona Alusport	4–2	Triman Navarra	Barcelona
21:00 (UTC+2)	Fernandao 4'; Ari 8'; Saad 22'; Torras 35'	Report	2' Rafa Usín; 9' Javi Eseverri	Stadium: Palau Blaugrana; Attendance: 2,000; Referee: Fortes Pardo & Martínez Flores

May 20, 2011	Xacobeo Lobelle	2–1	Fisiomedia Manacor	Santiago de Compostela
21:00 (UTC+2)	Diego 22'; David 23'	Report	9' José Ruiz	Stadium: Fontes Do Sar; Attendance: 3,000; Referee: Martínez Segovia & Sánchez Molina

May 21, 2011	Inter Movistar	7–4	Caja Segovia	Alcalá de Henares
12:30 (UTC+2)	Eka 12'; Ciço 17'; Ciço 19'; Eka 20'; Schumacher 27'; Ortiz 28'; Ortiz 29'	Report	11' Sergio Lozano; 15' Borja; 18' Sergio Lozano; 25' Borja	Stadium: Pabellón Caja Madrid; Referee: Cuesta Sánchez & García Morón

==== Third leg ====
May 21, 2011	Xacobeo Lobelle	3–1	Fisiomedia Manacor	Santiago de Compostela
20:00 (UTC+2)	Diego 10'; Aicardo 34'; Aicardo 39'	Report	3' Miguelín	Stadium: Fontes do Sar; Referee: Gallo Suárez & Velasco Martínez

May 22, 2011	Inter Movistar	2–4	Caja Segovia	Alcalá de Henares
19:00 (UTC+2)	Schumacher 12'; Eka 19'	Report	22' Matías; 27' Esquerdinha; 35' Antoñito; 37' (o.g.) Ciço	Stadium: Pabellón Caja Madrid; Referee: Felipe Madorrán & Gereta Ramírez

==== Semi-finals ====
===== First leg =====
May 28, 2011	Xacobeo Lobelle	4–7	Barcelona Alusport	Santiago de Compostela
16:15 (UTC+2)	Diego 2'; Raúl Campos 3'; Rafael 8'; Aicardo 26'	Report	17' Ari; 22' Fernandao; 24' Lin; 30' Lin; 35' Torras; 38' Saad; 39' Torras	Stadium: Fontes do Sar; Referee: Cuesta Sánchez & García Morón

May 28, 2011	Benicarló Aeroport Castelló	2–3 (a.e.t.)	Caja Segovia	Benicarló
18:00 (UTC+2)	Xapa 35'; Vadillo 37'	Report	27' Borja; 32' Borja; 44' Geison	Stadium: Pabellón Municipal; Referee: Fortes Pardo & Martínez Flores

===== Second leg =====
June 3, 2011	Barcelona Alusport	5–0	Xacobeo Lobelle	Barcelona
21:00 (UTC+2)	Torras 21'; Igor 22'; Javi Rodríguez 37'; Saad 39'; Paco Sedano 40'	Report		Stadium: Palau Blaugrana; Referee: Gracia Marín & Munez Carpintero

June 4, 2011	Caja Segovia	4–3 (a.e.t.)	Benicarló Aeroport Castelló	Segovia
12:30 (UTC+2)	Sergio Lozano 17'; Tobe 30'; Sergio Lozano 33'; Esquerdinha 44'	Report	9' Chaguinha; 28' Gonzalo; 36' Lolo	Stadium: Pedro Delgado; Referee: Blázquez Sierra & Gª Donas Salvador

==== Final ====
===== First leg =====
June 10, 2011	Barcelona Alusport	2–3	Caja Segovia	Barcelona
21:30 (UTC+2)	Borja 7'; Esquerdinha 15'; Antoñito 29'	Report	36' Saad; 39' Fernandao	Stadium: Palau Blaugrana; Referee: Peña Diaz & Peña Gomez

===== Second leg =====
June 12, 2011	Barcelona Alusport	4–2	Caja Segovia	Barcelona
17:00 (UTC+2)	Fernandao 8'; Igor 10'; Lin 19'; Torras 40'	Report	24' (o.g.) Carlos; 38' David	Stadium: Palau Blaugrana; Referee: Felipe Madorrán & Gereta Ramírez

===== Third leg =====
June 17, 2011	Caja Segovia	1–4	Barcelona Alusport	Segovia
20:30 (UTC+2)	Esquerdinha 10'	Report	17' Fernandao; 20' David; 29' Lin; 40' Lin	Stadium: Pedro Delgado; Referee: Gutiérrez Lumbreras & Lope Díaz

===== Fourth leg =====
June 19, 2011	Caja Segovia	4–2	Barcelona Alusport	Segovia
19:00 (UTC+2)	Geison 1'; Sergio Lozano 19'; Borja 34'; Geison 39'	Report	28' Lin; 40' Saad	Stadium: Pedro Delgado; Referee: Gracia Marin & Munez Carpintero

===== Fifth and final leg =====
June 26, 2011	Barcelona Alusport	3–2	Caja Segovia	Barcelona
21:30 (UTC+2)	Saad 1'; 19'; Fernandao 26'	Report	20' Esquerdinha; 35' Cidao	Stadium: Palau Blaugrana; Attendance: 6,872; Referee: Gracia Marin & Gutiérrez Lumbreras

=== Relegation playoff ===
semifinals
Lanzarote Tias Yaiza	1	1	_
*Marfil Santa Coloma	4	8	_
CD Burela	4	2	1
Gáldar Gran Canaria	0	4	5

final
*Marfil Santa Coloma	5	3	_
Gáldar Gran Canaria	3	2	_

- Marfil Santa Coloma remained in División de Honor.

== Top scorers ==
Rank	Scorer	Club	Goals
1	(Brazil) Betao	Inter Movistar	36
2	(Spain) Miguelín	Fisiomedia Manacor	35
3	(Spain) Nano Modrego	Sala 10 Zaragoza	33
4	(Brazil) Vinicius	ElPozo Murcia	32
5	(Brazil) Wilde	Barcelona Alusport	30
6	(Spain) Dani Salgado	ElPozo Murcia	26
7	(Brazil) Esquerdinha	Caja Segovia	24
8	(Spain) Sergio Lozano	Caja Segovia	23
9	(Spain) Héctor	Marfil Santa Coloma	21
10	(Spain) Torras	Barcelona Alusport	21

== See also ==
- 2010–11 División de Plata de Futsal
- 2010–11 Copa del Rey de Futsal
- Futsal in Spain
