= 2009–10 División de Honor de Futsal =

División de Honor
- Season: 2009–10
- Champions: ElPozo Murcia
- Relegated: Arcebansa Chint Zamora & Punctum Millenium Pinto
- UEFA Futsal Cup: ElPozo Murcia
- Matches: 240
- Goals: 1,571 (6.55 per match)
- Top goalscorer: Wilde (ElPozo Murcia) – 36 goals
- Biggest home win: Carnicer Torrejón 12–3 Punctum Millenium Pinto
- Biggest away win: Sala 10 Zaragoza 2–8 ElPozo Murcia Turística
- Highest scoring: Arcebansa Chint Zamora 8–9 Marfil Santa Coloma

The 2009–10 season of the División de Honor de Futbol Sala is the 21st season of top-tier futsal in Spain.

== Teams ==
=== Stadia and locations ===
Location of teams in División de Honor 2009–10

Team	Location	Stadium	Capacity
Azkar Lugo	Lugo	Pabellón Municipal de Lugo	2,300
Barcelona	Barcelona	Palau Blaugrana	7,500
Benicarló Aeroport Castelló	Benicarló	Pabellón de Benicarló	2,000
Caja Segovia	Segovia	Pabellón Pedro Delgado	2,800
Carnicer Torrejón	Torrejón de Ardoz	Pabellón Jorge Garbajosa	4,000
ElPozo Murcia Turística	Murcia	Palacio de Deportes de Murcia	7,500
Gestesa Guadalajara	Guadalajara	Pabellón de Guadalajara	2,000
Inter Movistar	Alcalá de Henares	Pabellón Caja Madrid	4,500
Marfil Santa Coloma	Santa Coloma de Gramenet	Jacint Verdaguer	2,500
MRA Navarra	Pamplona	Pabellón Universitario de Navarra	3,000
Playas de Castellón	Castellón de la Plana	Pabellón Ciutat de Castelló	4,500
Punctum Millenium Pinto	Pinto	Pabellón Príncipes de Asturias	5,000
Reale Cartagena	Cartagena	Pabellón Wsell de Guimbarda	2,500
Sala 10 Zaragoza	Zaragoza	Pabellón Siglo XXI	2,500
Xacobeo 2010 Lobelle Santiago	Santiago de Compostela	Pabellón Multiusos Fontes Do Sar	6,000
Arcebansa Chint Zamora	Zamora	Ángel Nieto	2,200

== League table ==
	Team	Pld	W	D	L	GF	GA	Pts
1	ElPozo Murcia	30	23	3	4	143	84	72
2	Inter Movistar	30	19	7	4	103	68	64
3	Caja Segovia	30	19	4	7	112	77	61
4	Xacobeo 2010 Lobelle	30	18	6	6	120	81	60
5	Barcelona	30	17	6	7	97	57	57
6	Marfil Santa Coloma	30	13	4	13	106	107	43
7	MRA Navarra	30	12	6	12	94	92	42
8	Carrnicer Torrejón	30	12	4	14	117	124	40
9	Azkar Lugo	30	11	7	12	92	113	40
10	Gestesa Guadalajara	30	11	5	14	106	119	38
11	Playas de Castellón	30	9	6	15	61	84	33
12	Sala 10 Zaragoza	30	8	8	14	93	103	32
13	Reale Cartagena	30	9	5	16	103	120	32
14	Benicarló Aeroport Castelló	30	5	8	17	70	90	23
15	Arcebansa Chint Zamora	30	6	4	20	87	122	22
16	Punctum Millenium Pinto	30	2	9	19	67	130	15

Source: lnfs.es

Championship playoffs
Relegation to División de Plata

== Championship playoff ==
quarter-finals
Carnicer Torrejón	1	2	_
ElPozo Murcia	6	5	_
FC Barcelona	3 (8)	4	2 (3)
Xacobeo 2010 Lobelle Santiago	3 (9)	2	2 (1)
MRA Navarra	0 (4)	2	_
Inter Movistar	0 (3)	1	_
Marfil Santa Coloma	4	0	4
Caja Segovia	2	2	10

semifinals
FC Barcelona	4	2	_
ElPozo Murcia	6	3	_
MRA Navarra	4 (5)	4	3
Caja Segovia	4 (4)	5	1

final
ElPozo Murcia	3	2	1	6	_
MRA Navarra	2	1	3	1	_

2009–10 División de Honor winners
(Region of Murcia)
ElPozo Murcia Turística
Fifth title

=== Quarter-finals ===
==== First leg ====
May 7, 2010	MRA Navarra	0–0 (4–3 p)	Inter Movistar	Pamplona
20:30 CEST+2		Report		Stadium: Pabellón Universitario; Attendance: 3,000; Referee: Alonso Montesinos & Rubio Fajardo
	Penalties
	Uge (penalty scored); Willian (penalty scored); Parrel (penalty scored); Rafa Usín (penalty missed); Javi Eseverri (penalty scored)		(penalty missed) Schumacher; (penalty scored) Torras; (penalty scored) Marquinho; (penalty missed) Juanra; (penalty scored) Daniel

May 7, 2010	Barcelona	3–3 (8–9 p)	Xacobeo 2010 Lobelle	Barcelona
21:00 CEST+2	Javi Rodríguez 9'; PC 10'; Fernandao 17'	Report	3' Leitao; 38' Eka; 40' Aicardo	Stadium: Palau Blaugrana; Attendance: 2,155; Referee: Martínez Segovia & Ponce Medero
	Penalties
	Javi Rodríguez (penalty scored); Igor (penalty scored); Saad (penalty scored); PC (penalty scored); Ari (penalty missed); Fernandao (penalty scored); Chico (penalty scored); Carlos (penalty scored); Jordi Campoy (penalty scored); Paco Sedano (penalty missed)		(penalty scored) Eka; (penalty scored) Rafael; (penalty scored) Juan Puertas; (penalty missed) Aicardo; (penalty scored) Leitao; (penalty scored) Rubi; (penalty scored) David; (penalty scored) Luis; (penalty scored) Palmas; (penalty scored) Caio

May 8, 2010	Marfil Sta. Coloma	4–2	Caja Segovia	Santa Coloma
18:30 CEST+2	Dani Salgado 5'; Dani Salgado 21'; A. Segura 35'; Héctor 39'	Report	11' Matías; 14' Kensuke	Stadium: Jacint Verdaguer; Attendance: 1,900; Referee: Felipe Madorrán & Gereta Ramírez

May 9, 2010	Carnicer	1–6	ElPozo Murcia	Torrejón de Ardoz
16:45 CEST+2	Jaison 40'	Report	5' Wilde; 10' (o.g.) Rómulo; 24' Vinicius; 26' Wilde; 37' Wilde; 39' Mauricio	Stadium: Jorge Garbajosa; Attendance: 2,500; Referee: Linares López & Sánchez Molina

==== Second leg ====
May 14, 2010	ElPozo Murcia	5–2	Carnicer	Murcia
21:00 CEST+2	Saúl 8'; Vinicius 11'; Wilde 33'; Wilde 35'; Ciço 35'	Report	19' (o.g.) Ciço; 36' Jaison	Stadium: Palacio de Deportes; Attendance: 3,500; Referee: Blázquez Sierra & Gª Donas Salvador

May 14, 2010	Xacobeo 2010 Lobelle	2–4	Barcelona	Santiago de Compostela
21:00 CEST+2	Aicardo 22'; Leitao 40'	Report	6' Saad; 30' Igor; 37' Javi Rodríguez; 40' Igor	Stadium: Fontes do Sar; Attendance: 3,500; Referee: Cuesta Sánchez & García Morón

May 15, 2010	Caja Segovia	2–0	Marfil Sta. Coloma	Segovia
17:45 CEST+2	Matías 27'; Keny 37'	Report		Stadium: Pedro Delgado; Attendance: 2,800; Referee: Gracia Marín & Munez Carpintero

May 15, 2010	Inter Movistar	1–2	MRA Navarra	Alcalá de Henares
18:00 CEST+2	Juanra 35'	Report	3' Araça; 23' Javi Eseverri	Stadium: Pabellón Caja Madrid; Attendance: 3,200; Referee: Contreras Tejedor & Pérez Álvarez

==== Third leg ====
May 15, 2010	Xacobeo 2010 Lobelle	2–2 (1–3 p)	Barcelona	Santiago de Compostela
21:00 CEST+2	Rafael 16'; David 19'	Report	31' Javi Rodríguez; 35' Fernandao	Stadium: Fontes do Sar; Attendance: 2,400; Referee: Gallo Suárez & Velasco Martínez
	Penalties
	Leitao (penalty scored); Rafael (penalty missed); Juan Puertas (penalty missed); Rubi (penalty missed)		(penalty scored) Javi Rodríguez; (penalty missed) Igor; (penalty scored) Saad; (penalty scored) PC

May 16, 2010	Caja Segovia	10–4	Marfil Sta. Coloma	Segovia
17:45 CEST+2	Keny 7'; Alvarito 9'; Keny 14'; Lin 17'; Geison 21'; Lin 31'; Alvarito 33'; Cidao 34'; Nano Modrego 38'; Nano Modrego 39'	Report	26' A. Segura; 36' Rafa; 37' Adolfo; 38' Saúl	Stadium: Pedro Delgado; Attendance: 2,800; Referee: Gutiérrez Lumbreras & Lope Díaz

=== Semi-finals ===
==== First leg ====
May 18, 2010	MRA Navarra	4–4 (5–4 p)	Caja Segovia	Pamplona
20:30 CEST+2	Rafa Usín 10'; Parrel 38'; Parrel 40'; Rafa Usín 42'	Report	11' Tobe; 22' Alvarito; 36' Geison; 45' Nano Modrego	Stadium: Pabellón Universitario; Attendance: 3,200; Referee: Blázquez Sierra & Gª Donas Salvador
	Penalties
	Uge (penalty missed); Willian (penalty scored); Parrel (penalty scored); Rafa Usín (penalty scored); Javi Eseverri (penalty scored); Jesús (penalty scored)		(penalty scored) Nano Modrego; (penalty missed) Tobe; (penalty scored) Jesús; (penalty scored) Lin; (penalty scored) Geison; (penalty missed) Alvarito

May 18, 2010	Barcelona	4–6	ElPozo Murcia	Barcelona
21:00 CEST+2	Igor 2'; Fernandao 24'; Chico 29'; Saad 40'	Report	10' Vinicius; 13' Ciço; 17' Wilde; 20' Wilde; 27' Mauricio; 39' Vinicius	Stadium: Palau Blaugrana; Referee: Peña Díaz & Peña Gómez

==== Second leg ====
May 22, 2010	ElPozo Murcia	3–2	Barcelona	Murcia
17:45 CEST+2	Saúl 19'; Álvaro 22'; Esquerdinha 31'	Report	17' Carlos; 28' Carlos	Stadium: Palacio de Deportes; Attendance: 4,500; Referee: Gutiérrez Lumbreras & Lope Díaz

May 22, 2010	Caja Segovia	5–4	MRA Navarra	Segovia
18:00 CEST+2	David 6'; Alvarito 9'; Nano Modrego 30'; Nano Modrego 31'; Tobe 38'	Report	6' Willian; 23' Rafa Usín; 34' Javi Eseverri; 36' Willian	Stadium: Pedro Delgado; Attendance: 3,500; Referee: Linares López & Sánchez Molina

==== Third leg ====
May 23, 2010	Caja Segovia	1–3	MRA Navarra	Segovia
18:00 CEST+2	Daniel 9'	Report	8' Araça; 10' Willian; 25' Willian	Stadium: Pedro Delgado; Attendance: 2,800; Referee: Cuesta Sánchez & García Morón

=== Final ===
==== First leg ====
May 29, 2010	ElPozo Murcia	3–2	MRA Navarra	Murcia
18:00 CEST+2	Kike 3'; Vinicius 25'; Mauricio 33'	Report	9' Roberto; 14' Robert	Stadium: Palacio de Deportes; Attendance: 4,800; Referee: Gracia Marín & Núñez Carpintero

==== Second leg ====
May 30, 2010	ElPozo Murcia	2–1	MRA Navarra	Murcia
18:30 CEST+2	Saúl 9'; Wilde 14'	Report	37' Jesús	Stadium: Palacio de Deportes; Attendance: 4,000; Referee: Peña Diaz & Peña Gomez

==== Third leg ====
June 5, 2010	MRA Navarra	3–1	ElPozo Murcia	Pamplona
18:00 CEST+2	Araça 16'; Javi Eseverri 21'; Javi Eseverri 40'	Report	30' Wilde	Stadium: Pabellón Universitario; Attendance: 3,000; Referee: Blázquez Sierra & Gª Donas Salvador

==== Fourth leg ====
June 6, 2010	MRA Navarra	1–6	ElPozo Murcia	Pamplona
20:00 CEST+2	Uge 8'	Report	3' Kike; 17' Kike; 24' Wilde; 34' Esquerdinha; 36' Wilde; 39' Kike	Stadium: Pabellón Universitario; Attendance: 3,000; Referee: Gutiérrez Lumbreras & Lope Díaz

== Top scorers ==
Rank	Scorer	Club	Goals
1	(Brazil) Wilde	ElPozo Murcia	36
2	(Spain) Héctor	Marfil Santa Coloma	35
3	(Spain) Dani Salgado	Marfil Santa Coloma	32
4	(Brazil) Eka	Lobelle Santiago	28
4	(Brazil) Jaison	Carnicer Torrejón	28
6	(Brazil) Vinicius	ElPozo Murcia Turística	27
7	(Spain) Sergio Lozano	Reale Cartagena	26
8	(Spain) Charlie	Gestesa Guadalajara	25
9	(Spain) Nano Modrego	Caja Segovia	23
10	(Spain) José Carlos	Carnicer Torrejón	22

== See also ==
- 2009–10 División de Plata de Futsal
- Futsal in Spain
