= 2010 Copa de España de Futsal =

2010 Copa de España
Tournament details
- Country: Spain
- Teams: 8

Final positions
- Champions: ElPozo Murcia
- Runners-up: Autos Lobelle

Tournament statistics
- Matches played: 7
- Goals scored: 47 (6.71 per match)
- Top goal scorer: Wilde (4 goals)

The 2010 Copa de España de Fútbol Sala is the 21st staging of the Copa de España de Fútbol Sala. It was held in the Pabellón Multiusos Fontes Do Sar, in Santiago de Compostela, Spain, between 11 February and 14 February 2010.

== Qualified teams ==
#	Club
1	Inter Movistar
2	ElPozo Murcia
3	Lobelle, host team
4	Barcelona
5	Cartagena
6	Caja Segovia
7	Marfil Santa Coloma
8	Sala 10 Zaragoza

== Final tournament ==
=== Knockout stage ===
Quarter-finals
11 February - Fontes do Sar
Xacobeo 2010	2
Caja Segovia	1
11 February - Fontes do Sar
InterMovistar	4
Sala 10	3
12 February - Fontes do Sar
Barcelona	5
Reale Cartagena	4
12 February - Fontes do Sar
ElPozo Murcia	6
Marfil Sta. Coloma	5

Semi-finals
13 February - Fontes do Sar
Xacobeo 2010	3
InterMovistar	1
13 February - Fontes do Sar
Barcelona	1
ElPozo Murcia	7

Final
14 February - Fontes do Sar
Xacobeo 2010	2
ElPozo Murcia	3

==== Quarter-finals ====
11 February 2010	Xacobeo 2010	2–1	Caja Segovia	Santiago de Compostela
19:15 (UTC+1)	Rafael 1'; Leitão 40'	Report	Lin 1'	Stadium: Fontes do Sar; Attendance: 4,200; Referee: Bláquez Sierra, Gutiérrez Lumbreras

11 February 2010	Inter Movistar	4–3	Sala 10	Santiago de Compostela
21:15 (UTC+1)	Borja 12'; Neto 15'; Schumacher 24'; Daniel 36'	Report	Corvo 9', 39'; Tejel 40'	Stadium: Fontes do Sar; Referee: Cid Bragado, Martínez Torres

12 February 2010	Barcelona	5–4	Reale Cartagena	Santiago de Compostela
19:15 (UTC+1)	Ari Santos 20', 37'; Saad 23'; Fernandão 31'; Cristian 34'	Report	Sergio Lozano 16', 20'; Cobeta 38'; Cristian 39' (o.g.)	Stadium: Fontes do Sar; Attendance: 3,800; Referee: Gracia Marín, Rubio Fajardo

12 February 2010	ElPozo Murcia	6–5	Marfil Santa Coloma	Santiago de Compostela
21:15 (UTC+1)	Vinicius 20'; Ciço 22'; Saúl 28'; Wilde 31', 35'; Mauricio 38'	Report	Héctor 14', 33', 37'; Dani Salgado 34', 38'	Stadium: Fontes do Sar; Attendance: 3,800; Referee: Peña Díaz, Peña Gómez

==== Semi-finals ====
13 February 2010	Xacobeo 2010	3–1	Inter Movistar	Santiago de Compostela
16:45 (UTC+1)	Leitão 2'; Eka 35'; Rafael 37'	Report	Borja 39'	Stadium: Fontes do Sar; Attendance: 5,800; Referee: Blázquez Sierra, Rubio Fajardo

13 February 2010	Barcelona	1–7	ElPozo Murcia	Santiago de Compostela
19:00 (UTC+1)	Fernandão 16'	Report	Vinicius 3'; Saúl 10', 27'; Juanjo 36'; Barroso 37'; Wilde 37'; Esquerdinha 40'	Stadium: Fontes do Sar; Attendance: 5,200; Referee: Gracia Marín, Gutiérrez Lumbreras

==== Final ====
14 February 2010	Xacobeo 2010	2–3 (a.e.t.)	ElPozo Murcia	Santiago de Compostela
16:45 (UTC+1)	David 22'; Pola 26'	Report	Vinicius 2'; Wilde 24'; Mauricio 41'	Stadium: Fontes do Sar; Attendance: 6,000; Referee: Gracia Marín, Gutiérrez Lumbreras

2010 Copa de España winners
(Region of Murcia)
ElPozo Murcia
Fourth title

== See also ==
- 2009–10 División de Honor de Futsal
