= Juanjo (futsal player) =

Spanish futsal player

Personal information
- Full name: Juan José Angosto Hernández
- Date of birth: 19 August 1985 (age 41)
- Place of birth: Cieza, Murcia, Spain
- Height: 1.85 m (6 ft 1 in)
- Position: Goalkeeper

Team information
- Current team: ElPozo Murcia

Senior career*
Years	Team	Apps	(Gls)
2001–2002	Intec Murcia		
2002–2003	ElPozo Murcia		
2003–2004	Intec Murcia		
2004–2010	ElPozo Murcia	232	(7)
2010–2013	InterMovistar	36	(1)
2013–2014	Santiago Futsal		
2014–2016	Benfica		
2016–2020	Barcelona		
2020–	ElPozo Murcia		

International career
	Spain	56	
- * Club domestic league appearances and goals as of 15 October 2016

Juan José Angosto Hernández (born 19 August 1985), known as Juanjo, is a Spanish professional futsal player who plays as a goalkeeper for ElPozo Murcia and the Spain national team.

== Club career ==
He started his professional career at Intec Murcia and then joined ElPozo Murcia.

== Honours ==
=== Club ===
ElPozo Murcia

- Primera División: 2005–06, 2006–07, 2008–09, 2009–10
- Copa de España: 2008, 2010
- Supercopa de España: 2006, 2009
- European Cup Winners Cup: 2003–04
- Copa Ibérica: 2006

Inter Movistar

- Supercopa de España: 2011
- Intercontinental Futsal Cup: 2011

Benfica

- Liga Portuguesa: 2014–15
- Taça de Portugal: 2014–15
- Supertaça de Portugal: 2015

Barcelona

- UEFA Futsal Champions League third place: 2018–19

=== International ===
Spain

- UEFA Futsal Championship: 2007, 2010, 2012, 2016
- FIFA Futsal World Cup: Runner-up 2008

=== Individual ===
- LNFS Best Goalkeeper: 2005–06, 2008–09, 2009–10
