= Tomaz Braga =

Spanish futsal player

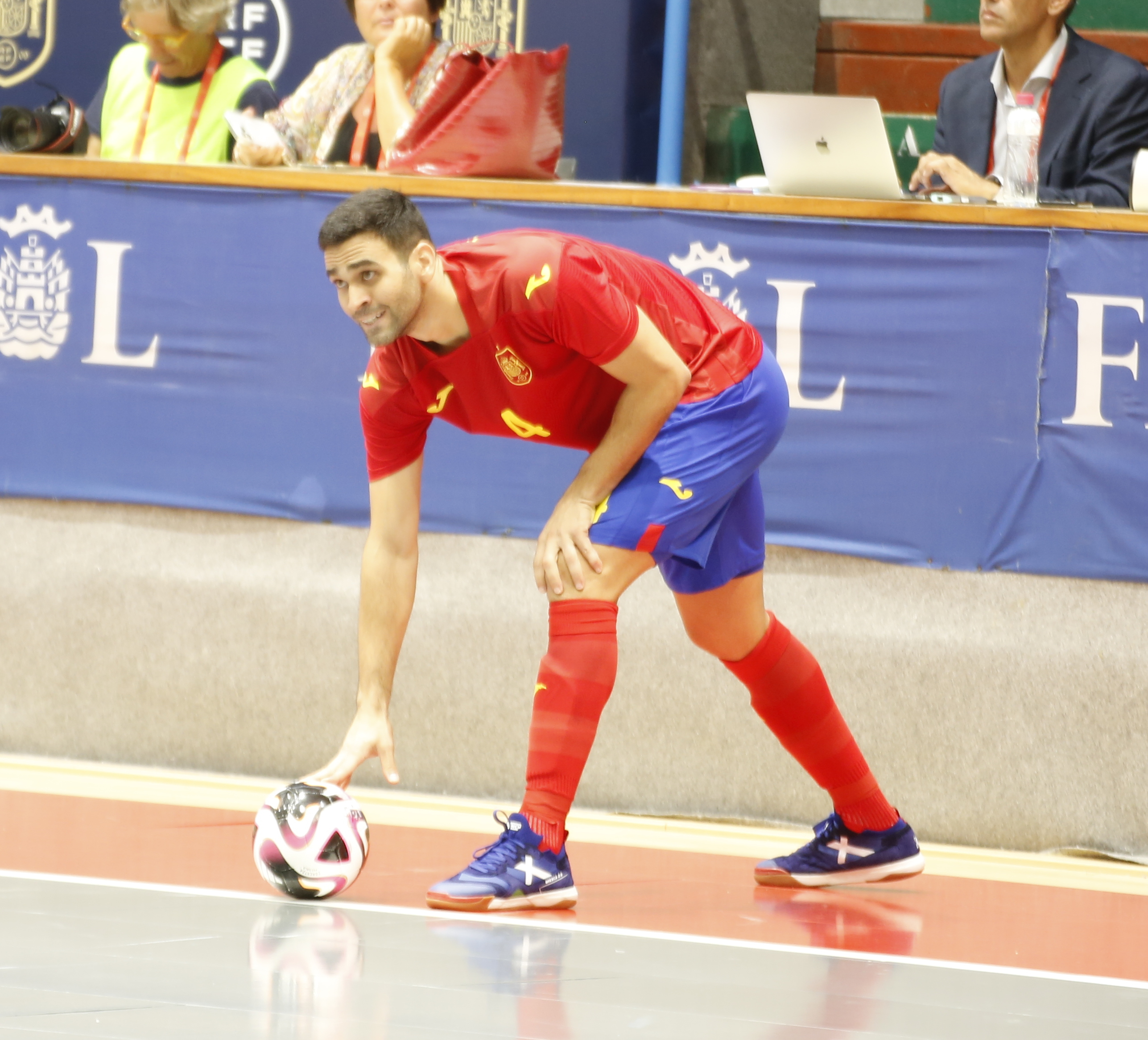

Personal information
- Full name: Francisco Tomaz Braga Nunes Cavalcante
- Date of birth: 13 September 1990 (age 36)
- Place of birth: Fortaleza, Brazil
- Position: Defender

Youth career
- 2008–2009: Sumov
- 2010–2011: Espaço Jovem
- 2013: Horizonte

Senior career*
Years	Team	Apps	(Gls)
2013–2023	Palma Futsal	349	(53)
2023–	Jimbee Cartagena	43	(13)

International career
2023–	Spain	11	(1)
- * Club domestic league appearances and goals

Francisco Tomaz Braga Nunes Cavalcante (born 13 September 1990), better known as Tomaz Braga, is a professional futsal player who plays as a defender. Born in Brazil, he has played for the Spain national team.

== Career ==
Born in Fortaleza, Ceará, Braga began his career as a football player for Horizonte FC in 2013. Later this year, he switched to futsal, where he went to play for Palma Futsal de Mallorca, a team for which he played for ten years and won an edition of UEFA Futsal Champions League, in 2022–23. In July 2023 he transferred to Jimbee Cartagena where he won the 2023-24 Primera División.

For the Spain futsal team, he represented the country in the 2024 FIFA Futsal World Cup, held in Uzbekistan.

== Honours ==
Palma Futsal

- UEFA Futsal Champions League: 2022-23

Jimbee Cartagena

- Primera División: 2023–24
- Supercopa de España: 2024

Awards

- 2022–23 LNFS best defender
