= FutsalFeed Best Team Awards =

FutsalFeed's Team of the Year Award is an award annually given by FutsalFeed through a poll in which fans from all over the world vote for the nominated candidates which were carefully selected by world-renowned futsal experts and FutsalFeed's editorial board. This is the only award in futsal awarded directly by fans.

== Winners ==
2020 Best Team of the Year

- Goalkeeper: Guitta
- Defender: Ortiz
- Winger #1: Ricardinho
- Winger #2: Sergio Lozano
- Pivot: Ferrão
- Coach: Ricardo Di Izeppe
