= AD Sala 10 =

Spanish futsal club

Fútbol Emotion Zaragoza
- Full name: Agrupación Deportiva; Sala 10
- Nickname(s): --
- Founded: 1987
- Ground: Pabellón Siglo XXI, Zaragoza, Aragon, Spain
- Capacity: 2,600
- Chairman: (Spain) José Ramón Moreno
- Coach: (Spain) Jorge Palos
- League: Primera División
- 2023–24: Segunda División, 1st of 16 (promoted)
- Website: https://adsala10.es/
Home colours	Away colours

Agrupación Deportiva Sala 10 is a futsal club based in Zaragoza, city of the province of Zaragoza in the autonomous community of Aragon.

The club was founded in 1987 and her stadium is Pabellón Siglo XXI with 2,600 seaters.

The club has the sponsorship of D-Link.

== Season to season ==
Season	Tier	Division	Place	Notes
1993/94	3	1ª Nacional A	–	
1994/95	3	1ª Nacional A	–	
1995/96	3	1ª Nacional A	–	↑
1996/97	2	D. Plata	2nd	
1997/98	2	D. Plata	4th	
1998/99	2	D. Plata	1st	↑
1999/00	1	D. Honor	12th	
2000/01	1	D. Honor	13th	↓
2001/02	2	D. Plata	2nd	↑
2002/03	1	D. Honor	5th	
2003/04	1	D. Honor	6th	
2004/05	1	D. Honor	8th	

Season	Tier	Division	Place	Notes
2005/06	1	D. Honor	13th	
2006/07	1	D. Honor	12th	
2007/08	1	D. Honor	15th	↓
2008/09	2	D. Plata	2nd	↑
2009/10	1	D. Honor	12th	
2010/11	1	D. Honor	9th	
2011/12	1	1ª División	8th / QF	
2012/13	1	1ª División	5th / QF	
2013/14	1	1ª División	14th	
2014/15	1	1ª División	10th	
2015/16	1	1ª División	11th	
2016/17	1	1ª División	—	

- 16 seasons in Primera División
- 5 seasons in Segunda División
- 3 seasons in Segunda División B

== Current squad ==
As of 18 November 2024

Note: Flags indicate national team as defined under FIFA eligibility rules; some limited exceptions apply. Players may hold more than one non-FIFA nationality.

No.	Pos.	Nation	Player
1	Goalkeeper	(Peru) PER	Daniel Álvarez
3	Pivot	(Spain) ESP	Nando Torres
4	Winger	(Spain) ESP	Óscar Villanueva
5	Winger	(Spain) ESP	Jorge Espín
7	Winger	(Spain) ESP	Alberto Inés
8	Winger	(Spain) ESP	Richi Felipe
9	Winger	(Spain) ESP	Adrián Rivera
10	Winger	(Brazil) BRA	Bateria
11	Pivot	(Argentina) ARG	Tomás Pescio
17	Winger	(Spain) ESP	Raúl López
19	Winger	(Spain) ESP	Miguel Lahoz
20	Pivot	(Spain) ESP	Pedro Altaba
21	Defender	(Spain) ESP	Nacho Gómez
22	Defender	(Spain) ESP	Carlos García
24	Defender	(Spain) ESP	Adri Ortego
25	Goalkeeper	(Spain) ESP	Iván Bernad (captain)
28	Goalkeeper	(Spain) ESP	David Marín

== Notable players ==
- (Brazil) Eka
- (Spain) Santi Herrero
- (Spain) Esteban Cejudo Guerrero
