= 2005–06 División de Honor de Futsal =

División de Honor
- Season: 2005–06
- Champions: ElPozo Murcia Turística
- Relegated: G.S.I. Bilbo & Albacete
- UEFA Futsal Cup: ElPozo Murcia Turística
- Matches played: 240
- Goals scored: 1,818 (7.58 per match)
- Top goalscorer: Fernandão, 40 goals
- Biggest home win: Caja Segovia 10–1 Playas de Castellón
- Biggest away win: Albacete 1–8 ElPozo Murcia
- Highest scoring: ElPozo Murcia 11–5 Caja Segovia

The 2005–06 season of the División de Honor de Futsal is the 17th season of top-tier futsal in Spain.

== Regular season ==
=== League table ===
Pos	Team	Pld	W	D	L	GF	GA	GD	Pts	Qualification or relegation
1	ElPozo Murcia Turística	30	22	5	3	156	87	+69	71	Title Play-Off
2	Boomerang Interviú	30	20	4	6	143	94	+49	64	Title Play-Off
3	Polaris World Cartagena	30	16	8	6	123	96	+27	56	Title Play-Off
4	Martorell	30	14	10	6	123	90	+33	52	Title Play-Off
5	Autos Lobelle de Santiago	30	14	8	8	127	99	+28	50	Title Play-Off
6	Playas de Castellón	30	14	6	10	135	133	+2	48	Title Play-Off
7	PSG Móstoles	30	13	7	10	95	96	−1	46	Title Play-Off
8	MRA Gvtarra Navarra	30	12	8	10	106	93	+13	44	Title Play-Off
9	Caja Segovia	30	12	4	14	123	117	+6	40	
10	FIAT Carnicer Torrejón	30	11	5	14	120	144	−24	38	
11	Azkar Lugo	30	10	7	13	93	110	−17	37	
12	Barcel Euro Puebla (Note: At end of season, Barcel Euro Puebla's seat was sold to CD Vigo FS)	30	8	9	13	117	122	−5	33	
13	DKV Seguros Zaragoza	30	8	7	15	96	128	−32	31	
14	Benicarló Grupo Poblet	30	7	5	18	80	118	−38	26	Relegation play-off
15	GSI Bilbo	30	5	6	19	94	136	−42	21	Relegation
16	Albacete	30	4	1	25	87	155	−68	13	Relegation

== Playoffs ==
=== Championship playoffs ===
quarter-finals
PSG Móstoles	5	1	_
Boomerang Interviú	6	5	_
Playas de Castellón	2	2	_
Polaris World Cartagena	4	7	_
MRA Gvtarra Navarra	10	3	_
ElPozo Murcia Turística	11	10	_
A. Lobelle de Santiago	4	3	1
Martorell	3	6	3

semifinals
ElPozo Murcia Turística	5	6	7
Martorell	3	5	4
Boomerang Interviú	7	4	3	1
Polaris World Cartagena	4	6	8	3

final
ElPozo Murcia Turística	3	5	3	2	4
Polaris World Cartagena	7	2	2	3	2

2005–06 División de Honor winners
(Region of Murcia)
ElPozo Murcia Turística
Second title

The Finals were broadcast in Spain on RTVE.

=== Championship playoffs matches ===
2005–06 Championship playoffs matches

==== Quarter-finals ====
(8) MRA Gvtarra Navarra vs. (1) ElPozo Murcia Turística:

- Game 1 @ Pamplona: MRA Gvtarra Navarra 10-11 ElPozo Murcia Turística
- Game 2 @ Murcia: ElPozo Murcia Turística 10-3 MRA Gvtarra Navarra

ElPozo Murcia Turística wins the series 2-0

- Total Aggregate: 13-21

(7) PSG Móstoles vs. (2) Interviú Boomerang:

- Game 1 @ Móstoles: PSG Móstoles 5-6 Boomerang Interviú
- Game 2 @ Alcalá de Henares: Boomerang Interviú 5-1 PSG Móstoles

Boomerang Interviú wins the series 2-0

- Total Aggregate: 6-11

(6) Playas de Castellón vs. (3) Polaris World Cartagena:

- Game 1 @ Castellón de la Plana: Playas de Castellón 2-4 Polaris World Cartagena
- Game 2 @ Cartagena: Polaris World Cartagena 7-2 Playas de Castellón

Polaris World Cartagena wins the series 2-0

- Total Aggregate: 4-11

(5) A. Lobelle de Santiago vs. (4) Martorell:

- Game 1 @ Santiago de Compostela: Autos Lobelle de Santiago 4-3 Martorell
- Game 2 @ Martorell: Martorell 6-3 Autos Lobelle de Santiago
- Game 3 @ Martorell: Martorell 3-1 Autos Lobelle de Santiago

Martorell wins the series 2-1

- Total Aggregate: 8-12

==== Semifinals ====
(1) ElPozo Murcia Turística vs. (4) Martorell:

- Game 1 @ Murcia: ElPozo Murcia Turística 5-3 Martorell
- Game 2 @ Murcia: ElPozo Murcia Turística 6-5 Martorell
- Game 3 @ Martorell: Martorell 4-7 ElPozo Murcia Turística

ElPozo Murcia Turística wins the series 3-0 and qualifies to Finals

- Total Aggregate: 18-12

(2) Interviú Boomerang vs. (3) Polaris World Cartagena:

- Game 1 @ Alcalá de Henares: Boomerang Interviú 7-4 Polaris World Cartagena
- Game 2 @ Alcalá de Henares: Boomerang Interviú 4-6 Polaris World Cartagena
- Game 3 @ Cartagena: Polaris World Cartagena 8-3 Boomerang Interviú
- Game 4 @ Cartagena: Polaris World Cartagena 3-1 Boomerang Interviú

Polaris World Cartagena wins the series 3-1 and qualifies to Finals

- Total Aggregate: 15-21

==== Final ====
(1) ElPozo Murcia Turística vs. (3) Polaris World Cartagena:

- Game 1 @ Murcia: June 10 ElPozo Murcia Turística 3-7 Polaris World Cartagena
- Game 2 @ Murcia: June 11 ElPozo Murcia Turística FS 5-2 Polaris World Cartagena
- Game 3 @ Cartagena: June 17 Polaris World Cartagena 2-3 ElPozo Murcia Turística FS
- Game 4 @ Cartagena: June 18 Polaris World Cartagena 3-2 ElPozo Murcia Turística
- Game 5 @ Murcia: June 24 ElPozo Murcia Turística 4-2 Polaris World Cartagena

ElPozo Murcia Turística wins the Final 3-2

- Total Aggregate: 17-16

CHAMPION: : ElPozo Murcia Turística

=== Relegation playoff ===
relegation playoff
Benicarló Grupo Poblet	1	7	1	3	4
Las Rozas Boadilla	2	6	2	2	3

- Benicarló Grupo Poblet remained in División de Honor.

== See also ==
- División de Honor de Futsal
- Futsal in Spain
