= Vinicius (futsal player) =

Brazilian futsal player

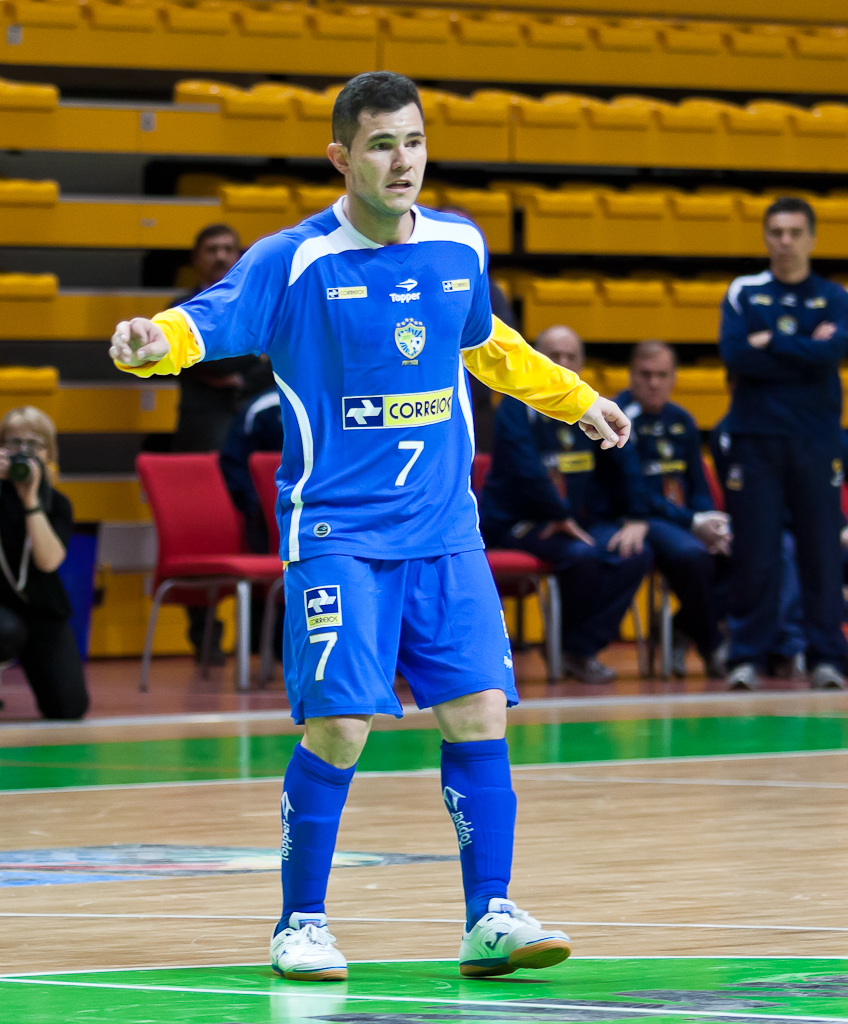

Personal information
- Full name: Vinicius Elías Teixeira
- Date of birth: 31 December 1977 (age 48)
- Place of birth: Cuiabá, Brazil
- Position: Universal

Senior career*
Years	Team	Apps	(Gls)
1997	Atl. Mineiro		
1998	Carlos Barbosa		
1999	Ulbra		
1999–2000	Inter FS		
2001	Carlos Barbosa		
2002	Ulbra		
2002–2004	Azkar Lugo		
2004–2011	ElPozo Murcia		
2011	MFK Dinamo Moskva		
2012–2014	Intelli		

International career
	Brazil	105	
- * Club domestic league appearances and goals

Vinicius Elías Teixeira (born 31 December 1977), commonly known as Vinicius, is a Brazilian futsal player who plays for Intelli as a Universal. Brother of Lenísio.

== Honours ==
- 2 World Cup (2008, 2012)
- 4 División de Honor (05/06, 06/07, 08/09)
- 2 Copa de España (2008, 2010)
- 5 Liga Futsal (1997, 2001, 2002, 2012, 2013)
- 1 Copa Brasil (2001)
- 1 Superliga (2013)
- 1 Taça Libertadores (2013)
- 2 Supercopas de España (2006, 2010)
- 2 Grand Prix (2005, 2009,2011)
- 2 Best player LNFS (08/09)(09/10)
- 2 Best Ala-pívot LNFS (08/09)(09/10)
