= Raúl Campos =

Spanish futsal player

Personal information
- Full name: Raúl Campos Paíno
- Date of birth: 17 December 1987 (age 38)
- Place of birth: Madrid, Spain
- Height: 1.85 m (6 ft 1 in)
- Position: Ala

Team information
- Current team: Palma

Youth career
- Móstoles

Senior career*
Years	Team	Apps	(Gls)
2005–2008	Móstoles		
2008–2009	Pinto	32	(12)
2009–2010	Zamora	30	(17)
2010–2013	Santiago	94	(63)
2013–2017	ElPozo Murcia	37	(30)
2017–2019	Benfica	55	(39)
2019–	Palma		

International career
- Spain
- * Club domestic league appearances and goals

Raúl Campos Paíno (born 17 December 1987), commonly known as Raúl Campos, is a Spanish professional futsal player who plays as a winger for Palma Futsal.

== Honours ==
ElPozo Murcia

- Copa del Rey de Futsal: 2015–16, 2016–17
- Supercopa de España de Futsal: 2016

Benfica

- Campeonato Nacional: 2018–19
- Taça da Liga: 2017–18, 2018–19

Spain

- UEFA Futsal Championship: 2014
