= Eka (futsal player) =

Brazilian futsal player

Personal information
- Full name: Edson Marques
- Date of birth: 26 January 1982 (age 44)
- Place of birth: Chapecó, Brazil
- Position: Pivot

Team information
- Current team: Jimbee Ct
- Number: 20

Senior career*
| Years | Team | Apps | (Gls) |
| 1999–00 | Jaraguá Malwee | | |
| 2001 | Anjo de Ciriciuma | | |
| 2002–03 | Tozzo Chapecó | | |
| 2004 | Anjo de Ciriciuma | | |
| 2005 | Jaraguá Malwee | | |
| 2005–08 | DKV Seguros Zaragoza | 84 | (56) |
| 2008–10 | Lobelle de Santiago | 73 | (56) |
| 2010–13 | Inter Movistar | 49 | (40) |
| 2013–14 | Pescara | | |
| 2014–?? | ElPozo Murcia | | |
| ??-2018 | Joinville | | |
| 2018-2020 | Jimbee Cartagena | | |
| 2018- | FC Kingersheim Futsal | | |
- * Club domestic league appearances and goals

Edson Marques (born 26 January 1982), commonly known as Eka, is a Brazilian futsal player who played for ElPozo Murcia as a Pivot. In May 2020 he left Jimbee Cartagena, having scored 11 goals in 20 matches. He signed a three-season contract with French team FC Kingersheim Futsal in July 2020.

== Honors ==
- 1 Copa do Brasil (2005)
- 1 Juegos Abiertos (1999)
- 2 Campeonatos Estatales (1999, 2000)
