= Prone Lugo AD =

Spanish futsal club

Prone Lugo
- Full name: Prone Lugo; Asociación Deportiva
- Nickname(s): Transportistas
- Founded: 1984
- Ground: Pavillón Municipal, Lugo
- Capacity: 2,500
- President: (Spain) Manuel Jesús Vázquez
- Head coach: (Spain) Diego Ríos Gayoso
- League: Segunda División
- 2015–16: Segunda División, 12th
Home colours	Away colours

Prone Lugo Asociación Deportiva is a futsal club based in Lugo, city of the province of Lugo in the autonomous community of Galicia.

The club was founded in 1984 and her stadium is Pavillón Municipal with capacity of 2,500 seaters.

The club has the sponsorship of Azkar transports.

Azkar Lugo logo

== Sponsors ==
- Airtel Prone Lugo - (1997–98)
- Café Candelas Lugo - (1998–02)
- Azkar Lugo - (2002–2014)

== Season to season ==
Season	Tier	Division	Place	Notes
1996/97	3	1ª Nacional A	6th	
1997/98	3	1ª Nacional A	1st	↑
1998/99	2	D. Plata	3rd	
1999/00	2	D. Plata	1st	↑
2000/01	1	D. Honor	14th	↓
2001/02	2	D. Plata	2nd	↑
2002/03	1	D. Honor	11th	
2003/04	1	D. Honor	7th	
2004/05	1	D. Honor	10th	
2005/06	1	D. Honor	11th	
2006/07	1	D. Honor	9th	

Season	Tier	Division	Place	Notes
2007/08	1	D. Honor	5th	
2008/09	1	D. Honor	9th	
2009/10	1	D. Honor	9th	
2010/11	1	D. Honor	11th	
2011/12	1	1ª División	13th	
2012/13	1	1ª División	10th	
2013/14	1	1ª División	13th	
2014/15	1	1ª División	16th	↓
2015/16	2	2ª División	12th	
2016/17	2	2ª División	—	

- 14 seasons in Primera División
- 4 seasons in Segunda División
- 2 seasons in Segunda División B

== Current squad 2012/13 ==
No.	Player	Full name	Pos.	Nat.
1	Óscar	Óscar Iglesias Lamas	Goalkeeper	(Spain)
13	César Quijada	César Quijada Bran	Goalkeeper	(Spain)
16	Illi	Ignacio González Almuíña	Goalkeeper	(Spain)
2	Juanpe	Juan Pedro Toldos Arrizabalaga	Defender	(Spain)
5	Diego	Diego Núñez Paz	Defender	(Spain)
10	Aranburu	Javier Aranburu Laso	Defender	(Spain)
12	Jhony	Jonathan Carrasco Moslán	Defender	(Spain)
7	Cuco	Raúl García Pérez	Winger	(Spain)
9	Antonio Diz	Antonio Diz Teijeiro	Winger	(Spain)
11	Solloso	Alejandro Solloso Bermúdez	Winger	(Spain)
14	Iago Rodríguez	Iago Rodríguez Ulla	Winger	(Spain)
17	Cospe	Alejandro Gruñeiro Zapata	Winger	(Spain)
18	Álex Diz	Alejandro Diz Teijeiro	Winger	(Spain)
8	Jandri	Alejandro Mínguez Márquez	Pivot	(Spain)
18	Bruninho	Bruno Cézar da Silva Moreira	Pivot	(Brazil)
19	Adri	Adrián González Varela	Pivot	(Spain)

== Trophies ==
- UEFA Futsal Winner's Cup: 1
  - Winners: 2005-06
