= AE Palma Futsal =

Spanish futsal club

Palma Futsal
- Full name: Associació Esportiva Palma de Mallorca Fútbol Sala
- Founded: 1998
- Ground: Son Moix, Palma de Mallorca, Spain
- Capacity: 3,800
- Chairman: Miguel Jaume
- Coach: Antonio Vadillo
- League: Primera División
- 2023–24: Regular season: 6th of 16; Playoffs: Quarter-finals
- Website: https://www.palmafutsal.com/
Home colours	Away colours

Associació Esportiva Palma de Mallorca Fútbol Sala is a futsal club based in Palma de Mallorca, city of the autonomous community of Balearic Islands.

The club was founded in 1998 and its stadium is Estadio Son Moix with capacity of 4,000 seaters.

In July 2014, the club was transferred from Manacor to Palma de Mallorca changing the club name to AE Palma Futsal and playing from 2014 to 2015 season in Palau d'Esports Son Moix.

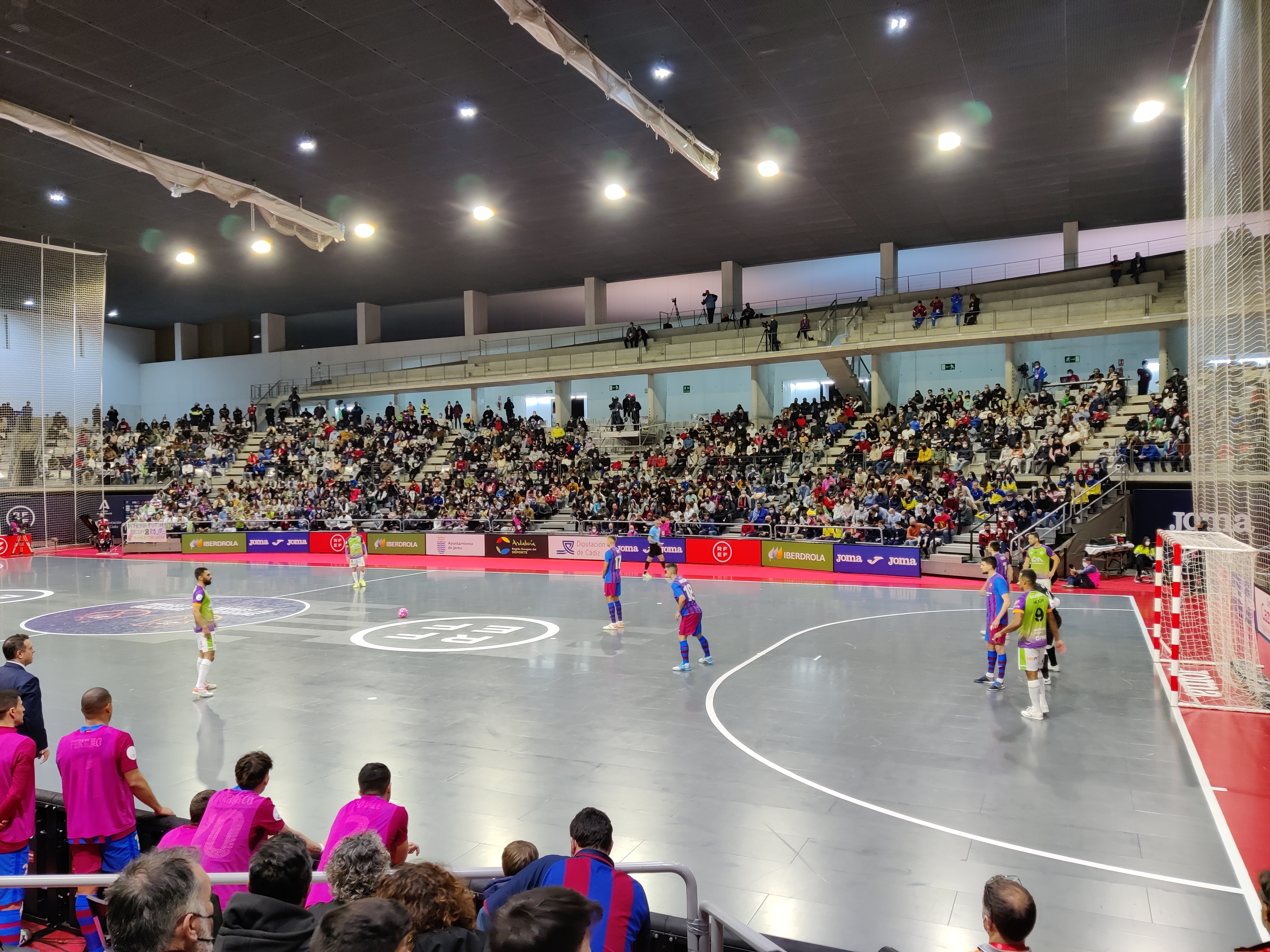
Supercopa 2022 final

== Sponsors ==
- Fisiomedia – (2007–2013)
- Hospital de Llevant – (2013–2014)
- Palma Futsal – (2014–)
- Conectabalear - (2020–2026)

== Current squad ==
As of 5 November 2024

Note: Flags indicate national team as defined under FIFA eligibility rules; some limited exceptions apply. Players may hold more than one non-FIFA nationality.

No.	Pos.	Nation	Player
1	Goalkeeper	ESP	Carlos Barrón (captain)
3	Goalkeeper	ARM	Luan Muller
9	Pivot	GEO	Bruno Gomes
10	Winger	ESP	Mario Rivillos
11	Winger	ESP	David Peña
12	Goalkeeper	BRA	Henrique Barbieri
13	Winger	BRA	Thierry Petraça
17	Defender	BRA	Neguinho
23	Defender	ESP	Manuel Piqueras
27	Winger	BRA	Ernesto Gris
28	Pivot	BRA	Fabinho
30	Pivot	ESP	Nil Tent
39	Pivot	ESP	Jesús Gordillo
44	Defender	BRA	Lucas Machado
55	Defender	BRA	Marcelo dos Santos
77	Winger	BRA	Mateus Maia

== Current technical staff ==
Position	Staff
Head coach	(Spain) Antonio Vadillo Sánchez
Assistant coach	(Spain) Juan Pedro Ortega
Fitness coach	(Spain) Joan Llompart
Physiotherapists	(Spain) Marcel Ruiz (Spain) Aitor Vicente
Club Doctors	(Spain) Miquel Mas (Spain) Jordi Alomar
Delegate	(Spain) Martín López

Last updated: 12 October 2021
Source: LNFS

== Season to season ==
Season	Tier	Division	Place	Copa de España	Copa del Rey	Supercopa de España	Champions League	Intercontinental Cup
1998/99	4	1ª Nacional B	1st					
1999/00	3	1ª Nacional A	1st					
2000/01	2	D. Plata	3rd					
2001/02	2	D. Plata	12th					
2002/03	2	D. Plata	13th					
2003/04	2	D. Plata	11th					
2004/05	2	D. Plata	12th					
2005/06	2	D. Plata	6th					
2006/07	2	D. Plata	2nd					
2007/08	2	D. Plata	1st					
2008/09	1	D. Honor	15th					
2009/10	2	D. Plata	1st					
2010/11	1	D. Honor	5th / QF	Quarter-finals	Third round			
2011/12	1	1ª División	10th		Quarter-finals			
2012/13	1	1ª División	11th		Second round			
2013/14	1	1ª División	11th		Quarter-finals			
2014/15	1	1ª División	5th / SF	Quarter-finals	Quarter-finals			
2015/16	1	1ª División	4th / SF	Quarter-finals	Runner-up			
2016/17	1	1ª División	6th / QF	Quarter-finals	Round of 16			
2017/18	1	1ª División	6th / QF	Semi-finals	Round of 16			
2018/19	1	1ª División	5th / SF	Quarter-finals	Quarter-finals			
2019/20	1	1ª División	5th / SF	Quarter-finals	Round of 32			
2020/21	1	1ª División	2nd / SF	Quarter-finals	Round of 16			
2021/22	1	1ª División	3rd / F	Quarter-finals	Round of 32	Runner-up		
2022/23	1	1ª División	1st / SF	Quarter-finals	Semi-finals		Champion	Champion
2023/24	1	1ª División	6th / QF	Semi-finals	Quarter-finals		Champion	Champion
2024/25	1	1ª División	2nd / SF	Runner-up	Semi-finals		Champion	Champion
2025/26	1	1ª División		Semi-finals			Runner-up	

== Trophies ==
=== International ===
- Intercontinental Futsal Cup (3): 2023, 2024, 2025
- UEFA Futsal Champions League (3): 2022-23, 2023-24, 2024-25

=== National ===
- 13 seasons in Primera División
- 9 seasons in Segunda División
- 1 seasons in Segunda División B
- 1 seasons in Tercera División
