= Santi Herrero =

Spanish futsal player

Personal information
- Full name: Santiago Herrero Amor
- Date of birth: 27 March 1971 (age 55)
- Place of birth: Zaragoza, Spain
- Position: Midfielder

Senior career*
Years	Team	Apps	(Gls)
- Palafox
- Talavera
2000–07	Zaragoza	150	(30)

International career
- Spain
- * Club domestic league appearances and goals

Santiago "Santi" Herrero Amor was a Spanish futsal player (Winger and back). Born in Zaragoza, Aragon, Spain.

== Career ==
He raised in AJC Palafox team, he was FIFA Futsal World Champ in 2000 with Spain in Nicaragua. He was also UEFA European (1998) and League Champion with CLM Talavera (1997), and League (1995) and Cup (1993) champion for Sego Zaragoza. He ended his career as player in Sala 10 Zaragoza (DKV), where ha was played in 80's.
