= Bateria (futsal player) =

Brazilian futsal player

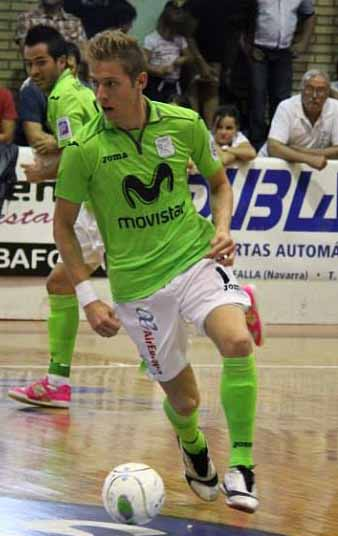
- Dione Alex "Bateria" in 2013.

Personal information
- Full name: Dione Alex Veroneze
- Date of birth: 16 December 1990 (age 35)
- Place of birth: Palmitos, Brazil
- Height: 1.78 m (5 ft 10 in)
- Position: Winger

Team information
- Current team: Viña Albali Valdepeñas
- Number: 11

Senior career*
Years	Team	Apps	(Gls)
2010–2011	Joinville		
2011–2014	Inter FS		
2014–2017	Barcelona		
2018	Marreco		
2018–2021	FS Cartagena		
2021–	Viña Albali Valdepeñas		

International career
- Brazil
- * Club domestic league appearances and goals

Dione Alex Veroneze (born 16 December 1990), known as Bateria, is a Brazilian futsal player who plays for Viña Albali Valdepeñas and the Brazilian national futsal team as a winger.
