= Roberto Tobe =

Equatoguinean futsal player (born 1984)

Personal information
- Full name: Roberto Tobe Belope
- Date of birth: 14 July 1984 (age 42)
- Place of birth: Madrid, Spain
- Position: Defender

Team information
- Current team: Signor Prestito

Senior career*
Years	Team	Apps	(Gls)
2000–2002	Rayo Lorea		
2002–2003	Leganés		
2003–2004	Algaraba Olías		
2004–2012	Caja Segovia		
2012–2015	Inter Movistar		
2014–2015	→ Baku United (loan)		
2015–2016	Carlisport Cogianco		
2016–2017	Luparense		
2017	Peñíscola		
2017–2018	Luparense		
2018	Thai Son Nam	8	(4)
2018–2019	Real Betis	0	(0)
2019–	Signor Prestito		

International career^{‡}
	Spain U-18	4	
2015–	Equatorial Guinea	2	(2)
- * Club domestic league appearances and goals ‡ National team caps and goals as of 13 December 2015

Roberto Tobe Belope (born 14 July 1984) is a futsal player who plays as a defender for Italian club Signor Prestito. Born in Spain, he captains the Equatorial Guinea national team.
