= ElPozo Murcia FS =

Spanish futsal club

ElPozo Murcia
- Full name: Asociación Deportiva ElPozo Murcia Fútbol Sala
- Founded: 1989
- Ground: Palacio de Deportes, Murcia, Region of Murcia, Spain
- Capacity: 7,500
- Chairman: (Spain) José Antonio Bolarín
- Coach: (Spain) Daniel Martínez
- League: Primera División
- 2026–27: TBD
- Website: https://www.elpozomurcia.com/
Home colours	Away colours

ElPozo Murcia Fútbol Sala is a futsal club based in Murcia, city in the autonomous community of Region of Murcia. The club was founded in 1989 and its venue is Palacio de Deportes de Murcia with a capacity of 7,500 seaters. The club has the sponsorship of ElPozo and Murcia Turística.

Throughout its history ElPozo has won five league titles and four Copa de España and a European Futsal Cup Winners Cup in 2003/04.

== History ==
=== Foundation and early years ===
Before the creation of El Pozo Murcia, Murcia city had a football team in the competitions of the Spanish Federation, known as Cruz Little Jewel of Murcia. The food group El Pozo had sponsored the team in the 1986/87 season, but with the creation of the LNFS wanted to have their own club. Therefore, in 1989 the company bought Cruz Joyita, their place in the top flight and federal rights.

In its early years, El Pozo invested heavily in international players and even bid for Maradona, but the Argentina star rejected. In 1990/91 El Pozo managed to qualify for the second phase of the championship league, and in 1992 made his first final of the season, but lost against Castilla-La Mancha FS. Their first title was the Copa de España in the 1994/95 season, against Castilla-La Mancha FS, and a year later won the Supercopa de España de Futsal.

=== Duda arrival as coach ===
After several seasons in which the club did not win a championship, El Pozo hired Duda as coach in 2001–02, a former player of Murcia in the 1990s. In its first year under the direction Duda, El Pozo was a finalist and semifinalist Spain Cup title LNFS. A year later, Murcia won their second Cup after beating Spain Boomerang Interviú Madrid, and reached the final of the league, who lost to Madrid side.

The Cup victory in 2003 allowed El Pozo to contest in the Cup Winners Cup, a competition he won and his first international trophy. Both in 2004 and 2005 El Pozo reached the final of the National League, but both times fell against the Interviú soccer. At the end of the 2004–05 season, Paulo Roberto announced his retirement from professional football and the club began a generational change with former footballer and sporting director. The club transferred to their stars Lenisio and Balo, and bought in their place Bacaro and Wilde, who became one of the top scorers of the club.

In the 2005–06 season the club changed its name sponsorship, becoming Pozo Murcia Tourist. In that year the club Duda finished first in the regular season, and beat Polaris World Cartagena in the final in five games. Thus, Murcia got their second league title after eight seasons. By the next year, El Pozo retain their title by beating Boomerang Interviú. That same year they won the last Iberian Cup disputed.

For the 2007–08 season Murcia had the chance to win five titles between national and international competitions. However, El Pozo could only win the Copa de España. In the championship, El Pozo Murcia finished the regular season in first place, but fell in the final against Interviú Fadesa. In addition, the club succumbed in the final of the UEFA Cup against Viz-Sinara Ekaterinburg.

El Pozo Murcia won two consecutive league titles in the 2008–09 and 2009–10 seasons. It was during that time the club won the domestic treble.

After the year of the treble players like Wilde, Alavaro, and Ciço left the club to go to Barcelona Alusport the first and Inter Movistar others. And Came From Bail, Dani Salgado, Jaison, was ceded Esquerdinha Caja Segovia and Alex come up with the first team after the transfer of Jaison. Even with all of the changes in 2010–2011, against all the odds, El Pozo reached the final of the Copa de España against Barcelona Alusport, but did not emerge as victors, and finished second in league table, but was knocked out of the playoffs by Benicarló Aeroport Castelló by a convincing 2–0.

The following year 2011–2012 the club brought in Miguelín and Grello from AE Manacor and Esquerdinha from Caja Segovia. The club lost the Super Cup at the start of the season to Barcelona Alusport, and there was a dubious start stumbling against Caja Segovia and Puertollano, but from there on, except for Umacon Zaragoza, nobody was able to beat the Duda, and El Pozo finished the league in first with record points and goals scored. Esquerdinha finished the season as top scorer. After some intense play off rounds against Zaragoza and Caja Segovia, El Pozo reached the final against Barcelona Alusport. The fifth game played at El Palacio Sports Murcia with 7,500 people in attendance. Barcelona snatched the league championship trophy in overtime. Victory would return to the club at the beginning of the 2012–2013 season when it won the Supercopa of Spain after beating Inter Movistar in the final on penalties.

In the season 2012–2013 Duda was chosen as second best coach in the world for the AGLA Futsal trophy behind Marc Carmona. On February 24, 2013, again face to face with the FC Barcelona Alusport in the final of the Copa de España with the latter winning with their third consecutive title.

== Honours ==
- División de Honor
  - Winners (5): 1997–98, 2005–06, 2006–07, 2008–09, 2009–10
- European Futsal Cup Winners Cup
  - Winners (1): 2003–04
- Copa de España
  - Winners (4): 1995, 2003, 2008, 2010
- Copa del Rey
  - Winners (2): 2015–16, 2016–17
- Supercopa de España
  - Winners (7): 1995, 2006, 2009, 2012, 2014, 2016, 2026
- Iberian Futsal Cup
  - Winners (1): 2006–07

== Season to season ==
Season	Tier	Division	Place	Notes
1989/90	1	D. Honor	4th	
1990/91	1	D. Honor	8th	
1991/92	1	D. Honor	2nd	
1992/93	1	D. Honor	4th	
1993/94	1	D. Honor	2nd	
1994/95	1	D. Honor	1st	Winner
1995/96	1	D. Honor	3rd	
1996/97	1	D. Honor	4th	
1997/98	1	D. Honor	2nd	
1998/99	1	D. Honor	6th	
1999/00	1	D. Honor	4th	
2000/01	1	D. Honor	3rd	
2001/02	1	D. Honor	1st	
2002/03	1	D. Honor	2nd	Winner

Season	Tier	Division	Place	Notes
2003/04	1	D. Honor	2nd	
2004/05	1	D. Honor	1st	
2005/06	1	D. Honor	1st	
2006/07	1	D. Honor	3rd	
2007/08	1	D. Honor	1st	Winner
2008/09	1	D. Honor	1st	
2009/10	1	D. Honor	1st	Winner
2010/11	1	D. Honor	2nd	
2011/12	1	1ª División	1st / F	
2012/13	1	1ª División	2nd / F	
2013/14	1	1ª División	2nd / F	
2014/15	1	1ª División	3rd / F	
2015/16	1	1ª División	3rd / QF	Winner

- 27 seasons in Primera División

== European competitions record ==
Last update: 1 July 2026

UEFA competitions
Competition	Played	Won	Drawn	Lost	Goals For	Goals Against	Last season played
UEFA Futsal Cup	25	19	0	6	132	50	2012–13
European Futsal Cup Winners Cup	4	4	0	0	27	9	2003/2004
Total	26	21	0	5	143	51	

== Current squad ==
=== First team ===
As of 1 July 2026

Note: Flags indicate national team as defined under FIFA eligibility rules; some limited exceptions apply. Players may hold more than one non-FIFA nationality.

No.	Pos.	Nation	Player

=== Reserve team ===
As of 1 July 2026

Note: Flags indicate national team as defined under FIFA eligibility rules; some limited exceptions apply. Players may hold more than one non-FIFA nationality.

No.	Pos.	Nation	Player

== Notable players ==
- (Brazil) Bacaro
- (Brazil) Wilde
- (Spain) Javier Serrejón
- (Spain) Álvaro Aparicio
- (Brazil) (Spain) Paulo Roberto
- (Brazil) Marcelo
- (Spain) Kike
