= Palacio de Deportes de Murcia =

Sports arena in Murcia, Spain

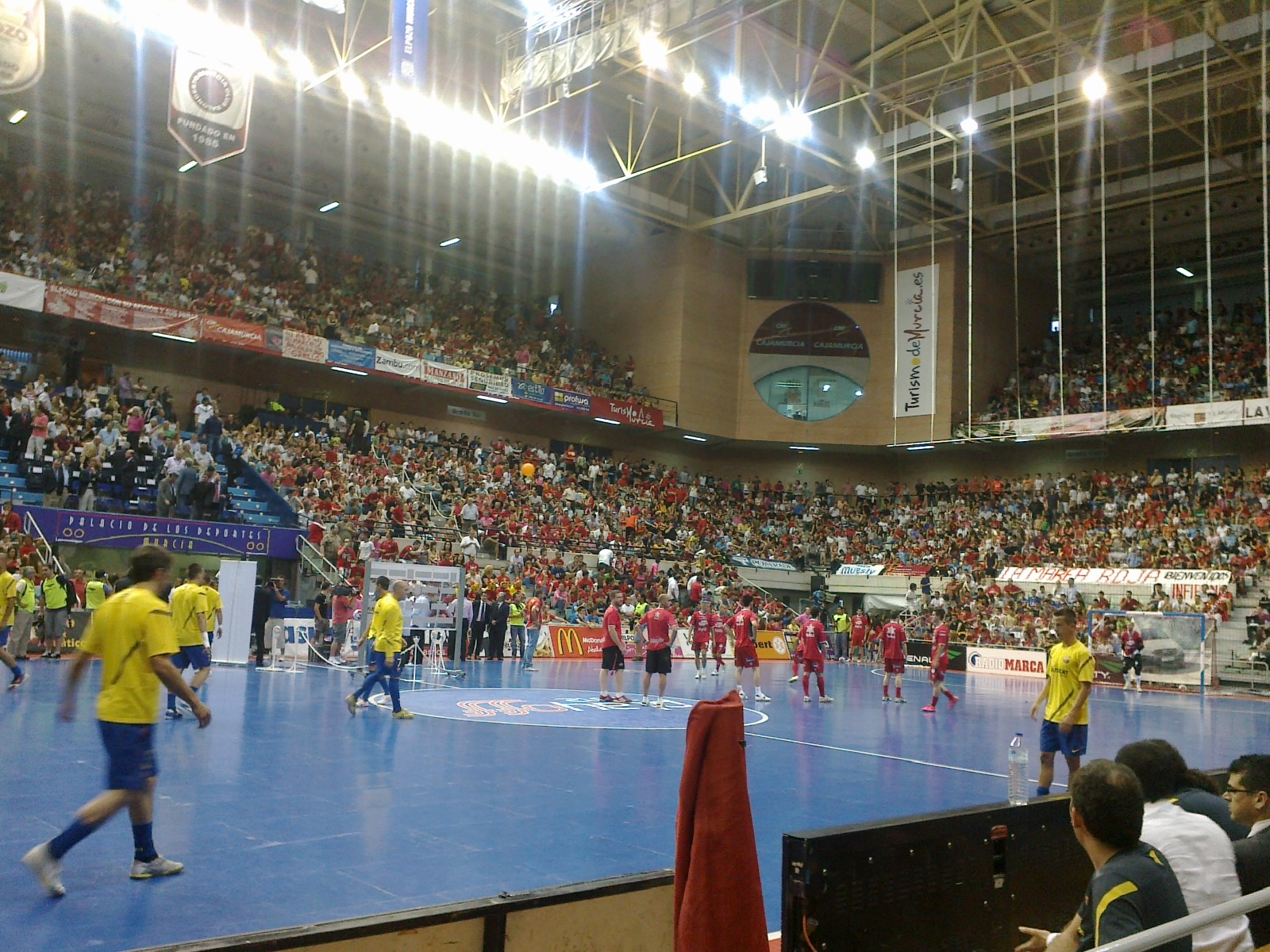
- Interactive map of Palacio de Deportes de Murcia
- Capacity: 7,454
- Surface: Parquet Floor

Construction
- Opened: 1994

Tenants
- UCAM Murcia; ElPozo Murcia FS

Palacio de Deportes de Murcia is a sports arena in Murcia, Spain. It is primarily used for basketball and Futsal and the home arena of CB Murcia and ElPozo Murcia FS. The arena holds 7,454 people and was built in 1994. It had a budget of 25 million dollars, and was the most modern arena in Europe the moment it was built.

== Basketball attendances ==
This is a list of attendances of CB Murcia at Palacio de Deportes.

Liga ACB					European competitions				
Season	Total	High	Low	Average	Season	Total	High	Low	Average
2011–12	91,041	6,972	4,800	5,355	Did not enter any European competition				
2012–13	96,262	7,068	5,012	5,662	Did not enter any European competition				
2013–14	94,928	7,269	4,718	5,584	Did not enter any European competition				
2014–15	101,457	7,500	5,029	5,968	Did not enter any European competition				
2015–16	106,756	7,596	4,624	5,931	Did not enter any European competition				
2016–17	90,185	7,500	4,631	5,637	2016–17 EC	34,699	5,671	4,321	4,957
2017–18	94,818	7,098	5,089	5,578	2017–18 CL	40,080	7,189	3,021	4,453
2018–19	95,280	7,708	4,797	5,605	2018–19 CL	31,471	5,021	2,006	3,497
2019–20 (Note: Season suspended due to the COVID-19 pandemic.)	55,096	6,877	5,014	5,510	Did not enter any European competition				

== See also ==
- List of indoor arenas in Spain
