= Pavillón Multiusos Fontes do Sar =

Arena in Santiago de Compostela, Spain

Fontes do Sar
- A Caldeira do Sar
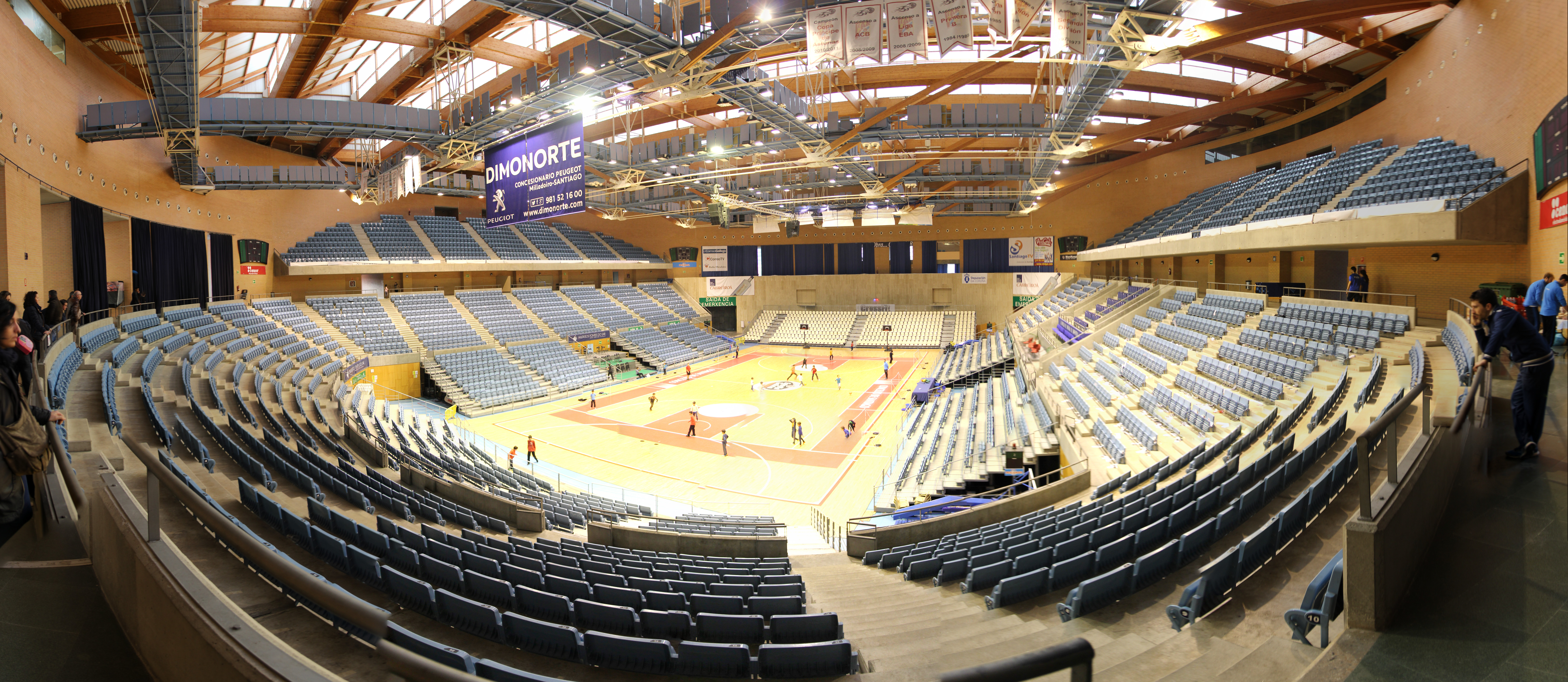
- Interactive map of Fontes do Sar
- Full name: Pavillón Multiusos Fontes do Sar
- Location: Rúa Diego Bernal; 15702, Santiago de Compostela, A Coruña, Spain
- Coordinates: 42.876191°N 8.530752°W
- Owner: Concello de Santiago
- Capacity: 6,666
- Field size: 80m x 50m

Construction
- Opened: 1998

Tenants
- Obradoiro CAB (ACB); CompoSala Futsal (LNFS)

Pavillón Multiusos Fontes do Sar (English: Multi-purpose Pavilion Fontes do Sar) is a multi-purpose sports arena in Santiago de Compostela, Galicia, Spain.

It is owned and operated by Santiago de Compostela city council. The arena serves as the home of the basketball team Obradoiro CAB as well as that of the futsal team CompoSala Futsal.

== League attendances ==
This is a list of league games attendances of Obradoiro CAB at Fontes do Sar.

Season	Total	High	Low	Average
2009–10 ACB	93,668	6,666	4,560	5,510
2011–12 ACB	89,100	5,890	4,600	5,241
2012–13 ACB	97,890	5,890	5,112	5,438
2013–14 ACB	85,841	6,000	4,438	5,049
2014–15 ACB	86,110	5,582	4,566	5,065
2015–16 ACB	89,486	6,000	4,724	5,264
2016–17 ACB	81,064	5,760	4,463	5,067
2017–18 ACB	84,698	5,705	4,213	4,982
2018–19 ACB	83,345	6,024	3,890	4,903
2019–20 ACB (Note: Season suspended due to the COVID-19 pandemic ACB.)	61,245	5,964	4,579	5,104
2020–21 ACB	Season played behind closed doors			
2021–22 ACB (Note: Some matches played with limited attendance.)	72,216	5,415	2,200	4,248
2022–23 ACB	88,376	6,000	4,712	5,119
2023–24 ACB	88,618	6,000	4,632	5,213
2024–25 1ª FEB	84,540	5,701	3,220	4,449
2025–26 1ª FEB	77,217	6,183	3,810	4,826
