= Sergio Lozano (futsal player) =

Spanish futsal player

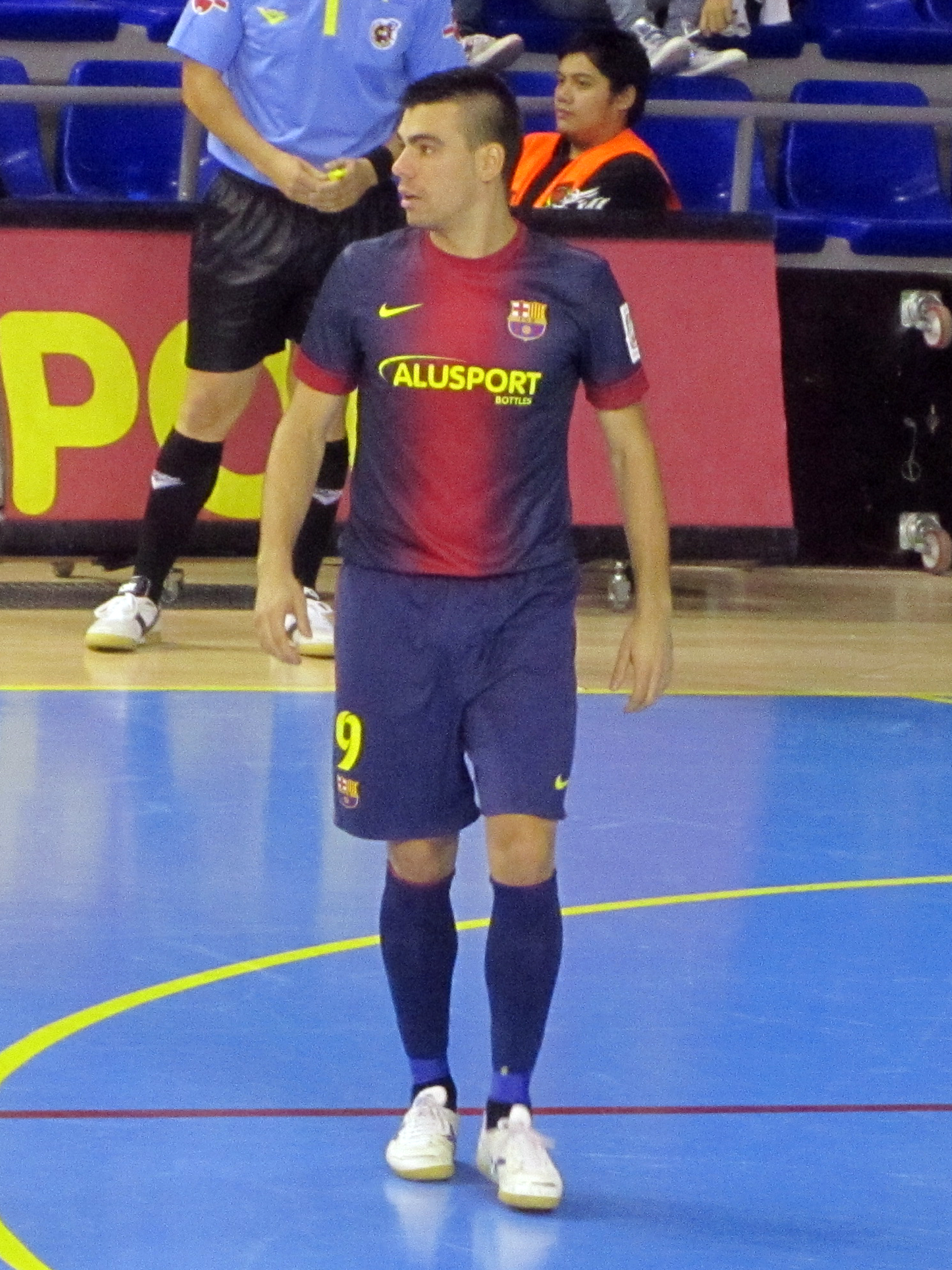

Personal information
- Full name: Sergio Lozano Martínez
- Date of birth: 9 November 1988 (age 37)
- Place of birth: Madrid, Spain
- Height: 1.81 m (5 ft 11 in)
- Position: Ala

Team information
- Current team: Barcelona
- Number: 9

Senior career*
Years	Team	Apps	(Gls)
2001–2004	Arganda		
2004–2008	Las Rozas	55	(69)
2008–2010	Cartagena	53	(41)
2010–2011	Caja Segovia	46	(33)
2011–	Barcelona		

International career
- Spain
- * Club domestic league appearances and goals

Sergio Lozano Martínez (born 9 November 1988), commonly known as Sergio Lozano, is a Spanish futsal player who plays for Barcelona as an Ala. In 2020 he was awarded a spot in the 2020 FutsalFeed's Best Team of the Year Award.

== Honours ==
- 6 Copa del Rey (2012, 2013, 2014, 2018, 2019, 2020)
- 5 Spanish Futsal League (2011/12, 2012/13, 2018/19, 2020/21, 2021/22)
- 5 Copa de España (2012, 2013, 2019, 2020, 2022)
- 4 UEFA Futsal Cup (2011–12, 2013–14, 2019–20, 2021–22)
- 1 Euro (2012)
- 1 Campeonato de Europa sub-21 (2007)
- 1 Campeonato de España sub-21 (2007/08)
- 2 Campeonatos de España juveniles de selecciones territoriales (2005/06, 2006/07)
- 1 Best Team of the Year: Winger (2020)
