= Wilde (futsal player) =

Brazilian futsal player

Personal information
- Full name: Wilde Gomes da Silva
- Date of birth: 14 April 1981 (age 45)
- Place of birth: Orós, Ceará, Brazil
- Height: 1.73 m (5 ft 8 in)
- Position: Pivot

Team information
- Current team: AC Sparta Praha
- Number: 13

Senior career*
Years	Team	Apps	(Gls)
1999–2000	General Motors		
2000–2001	Santos		
2001–2002	Banespa		
2002–2003	Ulbra		
2003–2005	MRA Navarra	66	(69)
2005–2010	ElPozo Murcia	185	(209)
2010–2016	Barcelona	77	(80)
2016–2017	Dinamo Moskva		
2017	AC Sparta Praha		

International career
	Brazil	12	
- * Club domestic league appearances and goals

Wilde Gomes da Silva (born 14 April 1981), commonly known as Wilde, is a Brazilian futsal player who plays for AC Sparta Praha as a Pivot.

== Honours ==
- 2 FIFA Futsal World Cup (2008, 2012)
- 2 UEFA Futsal Cup (2011/12, 2013/14)
- 7 División de Honor (2005/06, 2006/07, 2008/09, 2009/10, 2010/11, 2011/12, 2012/13)
- 4 Copa del Rey (2010/11, 2011/12, 2012/13, 2013/14)
- 5 Copa de España (2008, 2010, 2011, 2012, 2013)
- 1 Grand Prix (2009)
- 1 Liga Futsal (2002/03)
- 3 Supercopa de España (2006, 2010, 2014)
- 1 Intercontinental (2002)
- 1 Copa Ibérica (2007)
- 2 Campeonatos Metropolitanos (2000, 2002)
- 1 Campeonato Estatal (2002)
- 1 Copa Río São Paulo Minas (2002)
- 2 Best Pívot LNFS (2008/09, 2009/10)
- 2 Top scorer LNFS (2008/09, 2009/10)
- 1 Russian Superliga (2016/17)
