= 2015–16 Inter FS season =

Inter Movistar
2015–16 season
- Chairman: José Manuel Saorín
- Manager: Jesús Velasco
- Stadium: Pabellón Jorge Garbajosa, Torrejón de Ardoz
- Primera Division: Winner
- Copa del Rey: Quarter final
- Copa de España: Winner
- UEFA Futsal Cup: Runner-up
- Top goalscorer: League: Borja (31); All: Borja (43)

The 2015–16 season is Inter's 27th consecutive season in the Primera Division de Futbol in their 38th year in existence. This season Inter participate in the Primera Division, Copa del Rey, Copa de España, and the UEFA Futsal Cup. The season covers the period from 11 September 2015 to 30 April 2016 (end of regular season).

== Club ==
- Head coach: (Spain) Jesús Velasco

=== Squad ===
No.	Player	Full name	Pos.	Nat.
1	Luis Amado	Luis Amado Tarodo	Goalkeeper	(Spain)
27	J. Herrero	Jesús Herrero Parrón	Goalkeeper	(Spain)
15	Álex González	Alejandro González Pérez	Goalkeeper	(Spain)
14	Rafael	Rafael França Bezerra	Cierre	(Brazil) (Italy)
4	Lolo	Manuel Urbano Cañete	Cierre	(Spain)
23	Ortiz	Carlos Ortiz Jiménez	Cierre	(Spain)
16	Panou	Konstantinos Panou	Cierre	(Greece)
6	Daniel	Daniel Shiraishi Rollemberg	Ala	(Brazil)
10	Ricardinho	Ricardo Filipe da Silva Braga	Ala	(Portugal)
7	Pola	Adrián Alonso Pereira	Ala	(Spain)
8	Rivillos	Mario Rivillos Plaza	Ala	(Spain)
13	Darlan	Darlan Henrique Lopes	Ala	(Brazil)
12	Borja	Borja Díaz Torres del Molino	Ala	(Spain)
19	Cardinal	Fernando Alberto Dos Santos	Pivot	(Portugal)
3	Humberto	Francisco Humberto de Araujo Alves	Pivot	(Brazil)

== Competitions ==
=== Overall ===
Competition	Started/Current Round	Final Round	First match	Last match
Primera Division	4th leg of Final	Winner	11 September 2015	
Copa de España	Quarter-final	Final (Winner)	10 March 2016	13 March 2016
Copa del Rey	2nd Round	Quarter-final	30 September 2015	27 October 2015
UEFA Futsal Cup	Elite Round	Final (Runner-up)	12 November 2015	24 April 2016

=== Overview ===
Games played	50 (30 Primera Division, 9 Championship playoffs, 3 Copa del Rey, 3 Copa de Espana, 5 UEFA Futsal Cup)
Games won	44 (27 Primera Division, 8 Championship Playoffs, 2 Copa del Rey, 3 Copa de Espana, 4 UEFA Futsal Cup)
Games drawn	2 (2 Primera Division)
Games lost	4 (1 Primera Division, 1 Championship Playoffs, 1 Copa del Rey, 1 UEFA Futsal Cup)
Goals scored	247 (160 Primera Division, 38 Championship Playoffs, 14 Copa del Rey, 16 Copa de Espana, 29 UEFA Futsal Cup)
Goals conceded	91 (45 Primera Division, 26 Championship Playoffs, 6 Copa del Rey, 4 Copa de Espana, 10 UEFA Futsal Cup)
Total goal difference	+156 (+115 Primera Division, +12 Championship Playoffs, +8 Copa del Rey, +12 Copa de Espana, +19 UEFA Futsal Cup)
Clean sheets	6 (4 Primera Division, 1 Copa de Espana, 1 UEFA Futsal Cup)
Yellow Cards	85 (53 Primera Division, 19 Championship Playoffs, 6 Copa de Espana, 6 UEFA Futsal Cup)
Red Cards	3 (1 Primera Division, 2 Championship Playoffs )
Most appearances	(Spain) Borja (Spain) Rivillos (50)
Top scorer	(Spain) Borja (43)
Worst Discipline	(Portugal) Cardinal (Spain) Ortiz (9 (yellow card) )
Points	70
Best Home Result	11–1 v Santiago Futsal, Primera Division (09/01/16)
Worst Home Result	1–7 v FC Barcelona Lassa, Primera Division (27/02/16)
Best Away Result	9–2 v Gran Canaria, Copa del Rey (30/09/15)
Worst Away Result	4–4 v CD UMA Antequera, Primera Division (30/10/15)

=== Primera Division ===
==== League table ====
Pos	Team	Pld	W	D	L	GF	GA	GD	Pts	Qualification or relegation
1	Movistar Inter	30	27	2	1	160	57	+103	83	Qualification to the championship playoffs
2	FC Barcelona Lassa	30	23	5	2	157	78	+79	74	Qualification to the championship playoffs
3	ElPozo Murcia	30	19	6	5	130	81	+49	63	Qualification to the championship playoffs
4	Palma Futsal	30	17	6	7	107	80	+27	57	Qualification to the championship playoffs
5	Aspil Vidal R.N.	30	14	10	6	91	75	+16	52	Qualification to the championship playoffs
6	Magna Gurpea	30	14	6	10	111	85	+26	48	Qualification to the championship playoffs
7	Catgas Energia S.C.	30	12	8	10	123	124	−1	44	Qualification to the championship playoffs
8	Peñíscola RehabMedic	30	12	5	13	117	116	+1	41	Qualification to the championship playoffs
9	Burela Pescados Rubén	30	12	4	14	92	108	−16	40	
10	Santiago Futsal	30	8	7	15	99	119	−20	31	
11	DLink Zaragoza	30	8	7	15	108	119	−11	31	
12	Jaén Paraíso Interior	30	5	13	12	86	111	−25	28	
13	Levante UD DM	30	6	5	19	72	128	−56	23	
14	Jumilla B. Carchelo	30	5	6	19	85	135	−50	21	
15	Elche V. Alberola	30	4	5	21	75	156	−81	17	Relegation to Segunda División
16	UMA Antequera	30	4	5	21	97	138	−41	17	Relegation to Segunda División

Updated to match(es) played on 29 April 2016. Source: LNFS – Primera División and lnfs.es

==== Results summary ====
Overall								Home						Away					
Pld	W	D	L	GF	GA	GD	Pts	W	D	L	GF	GA	GD	W	D	L	GF	GA	GD
22	20	1	1	115	45	+70	61	11	0	0	66	17	+49	9	1	1	49	28	+21

Last updated: 27 February 2016.

==== Results by matchday ====
Matchday	1	2	3	4	5	6	7	8	9	10	11	12	13	14	15	16	17	18	19	20	21	22	23	24	25	26	27	28	29	30
Ground	A	H	A	H	H	A	H	A	H	A	H	A	H	A	H	H	A	H	A	A	H	A	H	A	H	A	H	A	H	A
Result	W	W	W	W	W	W	W	D	W	W	W	W	W	W	W	W	W	W	W	W	W	L								
Position	6	2	2	2	2	2	1	1	1	1	1	1	1	1	1	1	1	1	1	1	1	1								

Updated to match(es) played on 27 February 2016. Source: lnfs.es
A = Away; H = Home; W = Win; D = Draw; L = Loss

==== Matches ====
12 September 2015 1	Jaén Paraíso Interior	2–3	Inter Movistar	Jaén
18:00	Solano 38'; Eloy Rojas 40'; Dani Cabezón (yellow card); Cucu (yellow card); Emilio Buendía (yellow card)	Report	Pola 30', (yellow card); Borja 35'; Humberto 38'; Ricardinho (yellow card)	Stadium: Pabellón Municipal La Salobreja; Attendance: 1,200; Referee: Delgado Sastre and Rabadán Sainz

19 September 2015 2	Inter Movistar	9–4	Peñíscola RehabMedic	Torrejón de Ardoz
18:30	Rivillos 7'; Rafael 9', 34'; Daniel 14'; Pola 16', 18', (yellow card); Ricardinho 19'; Cardinal 32', (yellow card); Borja 33'; Jesus Herrero (yellow card)	Report	Javi Alonso 24', (yellow card); Martel 29'; Yeray 34'; Juan Carlos 39', (yellow card); Josiko (yellow card)	Stadium: Pabellón Jorge Garbajosa; Attendance: 2,000; Referee: Cid Bragado and Martínez Torres

25 September 2015 3	Santiago	2–4	Inter Movistar	Santiago de Compostela
21:00	Iván Rumbo 3', (yellow card); Quintela 34'; Antonio Diz (yellow card); Hugo Sanchez (yellow card)	Report	Borja 2'; Ricardinho 15'; Ortiz 30'; Cardinal 39'; Pola (yellow card)	Stadium: Pavillón Multiusos Fontes do Sar; Referee: Contreras Tejedor and Pérez Álvarez

3 October 2015 4	Inter Movistar	6–5	Magna Gurpea	Torrejón de Ardoz
18:30	Borja 2', (yellow card); Cardinal 23', (yellow card); Ricardinho 29', 30', 40'; Humberto 34'; Rivillos (yellow card); Jesus Herrero (red card)	Report	Eseverri 17', 35'; Araça 19', (yellow card); Rafa Usin 34'; Jesulito 36', (yellow card); Raúl (yellow card); Saldise (yellow card); Carlitos (yellow card)	Stadium: Pabellón Jorge Garbajosa; Attendance: 2,300; Referee: Cordero Gallardo and Linares

6 October 2015 5	Palma	2–6	Inter Movistar	Palma de Mallorca
20:15	Chicho 1', own' (11); Paradynski 40'; Attos (yellow card)	Report	Humberto 5', (yellow card); Cardinal 15', 38', (yellow card); Rivillos 27'; Ricardinho 38'; Borja (yellow card)	Stadium: Palau Municipal d'Esports; Referee: Fortes Pardo and Martínez Flores

10 October 2015 6	Inter Movistar	7–0	Levante UD DM	Torrejón de Ardoz
18:30	Ricardinho 4', 32'; Ortiz 5', (yellow card); Daniel 11'; Borja 18'; Pola 20', 35', (yellow card); Cardinal (yellow card)	Report	Kiko (yellow card); Hugo (yellow card); Diego (yellow card); Márquez (yellow card)	Stadium: Pabellón Jorge Garbajosa; Referee: Díaz Rodriguez and García Hernandez

17 October 2015 7	ElPozo Murcia	2–3	Inter Movistar	Murcia
13:00	Álex 11'; Lima 11', (yellow card); Miguelín (yellow card); Matteus (yellow card); Bebe (yellow card)	Report	Daniel 22', 39'; Darlan 28'; Ortiz (yellow card)	Stadium: Palacio de Deportes de Murcia; Referee: Rodrigo Miguel and Sánchez Molina

24 October 2015 8	Inter Movistar	3–1	FC Barcelona Lassa	Torrejón de Ardoz
13:00	Ricardinho 11'; Pola 13'; Rivillos 15'; Ortiz (yellow card); Daniel (yellow card)	Report	Aicardo 14'; Paco Sedano (yellow card); Bateria (yellow card); Wilde (yellow card); Ferrao (yellow card)	Stadium: Pabellón Jorge Garbajosa; Referee: Moreno Reina and Ramos Marín

30 October 2015 9	UMA Antequera	4–4	Inter Movistar	Antequera
20:45	Tete 17'; Javi Sánchez 18', 39'; Cecilio 33' de Silva (yellow card); Lucio (yellow card)	Report	Humberto 12', 19', 29', 40'; Ortiz (yellow card); Borja (yellow card); Rivillos (yellow card); Pola (yellow card); Cardinal (yellow card); Gonzalez (yellow card)	Stadium: Pabellón Fernando Argüelles; Referee: Fortes Pardo and Martínez Flores

7 November 2015 10	Inter Movistar	2–1	Aspil Vidal R.N.	Torrejón de Ardoz
18:30	Darlan 7'; Cardinal 31', (yellow card); Ortiz (yellow card); Pola (yellow card)	Report	M. García 29'; Luisma (yellow card); Pedro (yellow card)	Stadium: Pabellón Jorge Garbajosa; Referee: Juan Cerda and Martínez García

21 November 2015 11	Inter Movistar	6–0	Burela Pescados Ruben	Torrejón de Ardoz
13:00	Cardinal 4', 30'; Borja 7'; Ricardinho 32'; Daniel 35', (yellow card); Rivillos 36'	Report	Isi (yellow card)	Stadium: Pabellón Jorge Garbajosa; Referee: Alonso Montesinos and Urdanoz Apezteguia

24 November 2015 12	Elche CF	2–7	Inter Movistar	Elche
21:00	Pitu 10'; Óscar Ruiz 37'; Carlos Anós (yellow card); Vicen (yellow card)	Report	Rivillos 4', 9'; Cardinal 12'; Borja 21', 34'; Humberto 33'; Pola 36'	Stadium: Esperanza Lag; Referee: Fortes Pardo and Martínez Flores

28 November 2015 13	Inter Movistar	8–2	D-Link Zaragoza	Torrejón de Ardoz
18:30	Ricardinho 8'; Daniel 12'; Pola 15', 37'; Borja 17', (yellow card); J. Herrero 28'; Rivillos 30'; Javito 40'; Ortiz (yellow card)	Report	Richi Felipe 6', 30'; Victor Tehel (yellow card); Retamar (yellow card)	Stadium: Pabellón Jorge Garbajosa; Referee: Díaz Rodríguez and García Hernández

4 December 2015 14	Jumilla Bodegas Carchelo	2–5	Inter Movistar	Jumilla
21:15	Javaloy 27'; Cristian Rubio 38'	Report	Pola 15'; Cardinal 28'; Borja 29', 30', 37'; Ricardinho (yellow card); Ortiz (yellow card)	Stadium: Pabellón Carlos García Ruiz; Referee: Delgado Sastre and González Ruano

18 December 2015 15	Inter Movistar	4–1	Catgas Energia Santa Coloma	Torrejón de Ardoz
21:00	Pola 8'; Borja 25'; Ricardinho 33', 37'; Daniel (yellow card)	Report	Rafa López 16'; Fabian (yellow card)	Stadium: Pabellón Jorge Garbajosa; Attendance: 2,000; Referee: Cid Bragado and Martínez Torres

22 December 2015 16	Inter Movistar	7–0	Jaén Paraíso Interior	Torrejón de Ardoz
21:00	Darlan 8', (yellow card); Pola 18'; Cardinal 23', 24'; Ricardinho 35', (yellow card); Humberto 36', (yellow card); Borja 38'	Report	Carlos Muñoz (yellow card); José López (yellow card); Dani Martín (yellow card)	Stadium: Pabellón Jorge Garbajosa; Referee: Gallo Suarez and Velasco Martinez

4 January 2016 17	Peñíscola RehabMedic	1–4	Inter Movistar	Peñíscola
21:00	Martel 33'; Juan Carlos (yellow card); Josiko (yellow card)	Report	Ortiz 2', (yellow card); Pola 29'; Darlan 36'; Ricardinho 39'	Stadium: Pabellón Municipal; Referee: Rodrigo Miguel and Sánchez Molina

9 January 2016 18	Inter Movistar	11–1	Santiago	Torrejón de Ardoz
18:30	Ricardinho 10'; Borja 15', 34', 39'; Pola 21', 33'; Darlan 24'; Rivillos 27'; Humberto 31', 40'; Rafael 36', (yellow card)	Report	Hugo Sánchez 4', (yellow card)	Stadium: Pabellón Jorge Garbajosa; Referee: Peña Diaz and Peña Gomez

16 January 2016 19	Magna Gurpea	3–5	Inter Movistar	Pamplona
18:00	Carlitos 19', (yellow card); Eseverri 30', 39', (yellow card); Rafa Usin (yellow card); Victor (yellow card); R. Martil (yellow card)	Report	Ortiz 11', 13', (yellow card); Humberto 15'; Pola 30', (yellow card); Daniel 39'	Stadium: Pabellón Anaitasuna; Referee: Gallo Suarez and Velasco Martinez

20 January 2016 20	Levante UD DM	1–7	Inter Movistar	Valencia
20:00	Borja Milán 40', (yellow card); Márquez (yellow card); Cristian (yellow card); Hugo (yellow card)	Report	Humberto 3'; Rafael 20'; Ricardinho 26'; Cardinal 34'; Pola 36'; Rivillos 36', 37'; Daniel (yellow card)	Stadium: El Cabanyal; Referee: Juan Cerda and Martínez García

20 February 2016 21	Inter Movistar	3–2	ElPozo Murcia	Torrejón de Ardoz
21:00	Ortiz 9'; Borja 15'; Humberto 25'; Cardinal (yellow card); Ricardinho (yellow card)	Report	Lima 28'; Marinovic 29'; José Ruiz (yellow card)	Stadium: Pabellón Jorge Garbajosa; Referee: Peña Diaz and Peña Gomez

27 February 2016 22	FC Barcelona Lassa	7–1	Inter Movistar	Barcelona
13:00	Dyego 1', (yellow card); Saad 6'; Bateria 8'; Ferrao 16'; Sergio Lozano 20'; Wilde 26'; Gabriel (yellow card)	Report	Daniel 24' (own); Rafael 27'; Humberto (yellow card)	Stadium: Palau Blaugrana; Referee: Santander Flamarique and Urdanoz Apezteguia

=== Copa del Rey ===
The 2015–16 Copa del Rey is the 6th staging of the Copa del Rey de Futsal. The competition started on 22 September with First Round matches. The Final date and venue are to be decided yet. Inter Movistar are the defending champions and joined the competition in the Second Round.

30 September 2015 Second round	Gran Canaria	2–9	Inter Movistar	Las Palmas
21:00 (UTC+1)	V Cachón 14'; Bingyoba 8'	Report	Cardinal 7', 33'; Borja 10', 12', 26', 28'; Carlos Ortiz 31'; Rivillos 34'; Darlan 37'	Stadium: Centro Insular de Deportes; Referee: Díaz Rodríguez, Díaz Rodríguez

14 October 2015 Third round	Real Betis FSN	2–4	Inter Movistar	Seville
21:00 (UTC+2)	Juanillo 18'; Paco 34'	Report	Darlan 4'; Cardinal 17'; Borja 22'; C Ortiz 39'	Stadium: Palacio de Deportes; Attendance: 5,121; Referee: Cordero Gallardo, Linares López

27 October 2015 Quarter final	Inter Movistar	1–2	Palma Futsal	Torrejón de Ardoz
21:00 (UTC+1)	Rivillos 1'; Cardinal (yellow card)	Report	Vadillo 35'; Pizarro 40', (yellow card); Paradynski (yellow card); Sergio (yellow card); Joao Batista (yellow card) (yellow-red card)	Stadium: Pabellón Jorge Garbajosa; Referee: Gutiérrez Lumbreras, Lope Díaz

=== Copa de España ===
The Copa de España Quarter Final Draw was made on 28 December 2015.

10 March Quarter Final	Movistar Inter	8–0	Palma Futsal	Guadalajara
21:15 (UTC+1)	Rafael 13', 36'; Borja 24', 33'; Ortiz 24'; Darlan 26'; Rivillos 30'; Daniel 32'	Report		Stadium: Palacio Multiusos; Attendance: 4,000; Referee: Peña Díaz, Peña Gómez

12 March Semi Final	Burela Pescados Rubén	3–6	Movistar Inter	Guadalajara
18:00 (UTC+1)	Chino 8'; Hélder 10'; Míguez 25'	Report	Ortiz 11'; Rafael 12'; Herrero 16'; Borja 20'; Cardinal 33'; Ricardinho 39'	Stadium: Palacio Multiusos; Attendance: 5,000; Referee: Juan Cerdá, Martínez García

13 March Final	Movistar Inter	2–1	ElPozo Murcia	Guadalajara
20:15 (UTC+1)	Carlos Ortiz 21'; Ricardinho 23'	Report	Bebe 20'	Stadium: Palacio Multiusos; Attendance: 5,000; Referee: Peña Díaz, Peña Gómez

=== UEFA Futsal Cup ===
The 2015–16 UEFA Futsal Cup is the 30th edition of Europe's premier club futsal tournament, and the 15th edition under the current UEFA Futsal Cup format organized by UEFA. Qualifying rounds started on 25 August 2015. Inter Movistar entered the competition in the Elite Round which started on 12 November 2015.

==== Group A ====
Pos	Team	Pld	W	D	L	GF	GA	GD	Pts	Qualification
1	(Spain) Inter FS (H)	3	3	0	0	22	4	+18	9	Final tournament
2	(Belarus) LSM Lida	3	2	0	1	13	8	+5	6	
3	(Slovenia) Dobovec	3	1	0	2	4	16	−12	3	
4	(France) Kremlin-Bicêtre United	3	0	0	3	5	16	−11	0	

Source: UEFA
Rules for classification: Tiebreakers
(H) Hosts

12 November 2015	Inter FS (Spain)	8–0	(Slovenia) KMN Dobovec	Pabellón Jorge Garbajosa, Torrejón de Ardoz
21:00	Ricardinho 3', 14'; Borja 6', 31'; Cardinal 10', 12'; Kordiš 15' (o.g.); Rivillos 30'	Report		Referee: Pascal Lemal (Belgium), Balázs Farkas (Hungary)

13 November 2015	Inter FS (Spain)	10–2	(France) Kremlin-Bicêtre United	Pabellón Jorge Garbajosa, Torrejón de Ardoz
21:00	Cardinal 4', 14', 18'; Darlan 10'; Ricardinho 20'; Borja 24', 33'; Pola 24'; Humberto 34'; Panou 40'	Report	Vita 19'; Rondon 30'	Referee: Danijel Janošević (Croatia), Marc Birkett (England)

15 November 2015	LSM Lida (Belarus)	2–4	(Spain) Inter FS	Pabellón Jorge Garbajosa, Torrejón de Ardoz
20:00	Goncharov 26', 37'	Report	Cardinal 28' (pen.); Ortiz 31'; Ricardinho 34'; Herrero 37'	Referee: Danijel Janošević (Croatia), Marc Birkett (England)

==== Final tournament ====
The hosts of the final tournament was selected by UEFA from the four qualified teams on 11 December 2015 and will be staged by Inter FS at the Palacio Multiusos de Guadalajara in Guadalajara on 21 or 22 and 23 or 24 April 2016. The draw for the final tournament will be held in spring 2016 at the host city. The four teams are drawn into two knockout semi-finals without any restrictions. The semi-final winners advance to the final, while the losers play in the third place match.

Qualified teams

- (Spain) Inter FS (hosts)
- (Italy) ASD Pescara
- (Russia) TTG-Ugra Yugorsk
- (Portugal) SL Benfica

=== Semi-final ===
22 April 2016
20:30

ASD Pescara (Italy)	2–4	(Spain) Inter FS
Canal 6'; Salas 38'	Report	Ricardinho 9'; Cardinal 12'; Rafael 21'; Mario Rivillos 40'

Palacio Multiusos de Guadalajara, Guadalajara
Referee: Saša Tomić (Croatia), Bogdan Sorescu (Romania)

=== Final ===
24 April 2016
20:30

TTG-Ugra Yugorsk (Russia)	4–3	(Spain) Inter FS
Afanasyev 6', 38'; Marcênio 18'; Katata 40'	Report	Cardinal 6'; Pola 14'; Shiraishi 40'

Palacio Multiusos de Guadalajara, Guadalajara
Referee: Bogdan Sorescu (Romania), Saša Tomić (Croatia)

== Statistics ==
=== Appearances and goals ===
Last updated on 18 June 2016.

No.	Pos	Nat	Player	Total		Primera Division		Copa del Rey		Copa de Espana		UEFA Futsal Cup	
No.	Pos	Nat	Player	Apps	Goals	Apps	Goals	Apps	Goals	Apps	Goals	Apps	Goals
1	GK	(Spain) ESP	Luis Amado	7	0	5+1	0	1	0	0	0	0	0
27	GK	(Spain) ESP	Jesús Herrero	34	3	27	1	0	0	2	1	5	1
15	GK	(Spain) ESP	Alejandro González Pérez	12	0	7+1	0	2	0	1	0	0+1	0
14	DF	(Brazil) BRA	Rafael	24	14	4+15	10	0	0	3	3	1+1	1
4	DF	(Spain) ESP	Lolo	10	0	0+7	0	1	0	0	0	0+2	0
23	DF	(Spain) ESP	Ortiz	48	19	30+8	13	2	2	3	3	4+1	1
18	DF	(Spain) ESP	José Antonio	1	0	0+1	0	0	0	0	0	0	0
16	DF	(Greece) GRE	Konstantinos Panou	4	1	0+1	0	0	0	0	0	0+3	1
5	MF	(Spain) ESP	Javito	3	1	0+3	1	0	0	0	0	0	0
6	MF	(Brazil) BRA	Daniel	49	19	30+9	16	2	0	0+3	1	4+1	2
10	MF	(Portugal) POR	Ricardinho	44	32	25+10	25	1	0	3	2	4+1	5
7	MF	(Spain) ESP	Pola	47	22	11+25	20	3	0	0+3	0	1+4	2
8	MF	(Spain) ESP	Rivillos	50	27	12+27	22	3	2	1+2	1	2+3	2
13	MF	(Brazil) BRA	Darlan	45	12	3+31	8	3	2	0+3	1	0+5	1
12	MF	(Spain) ESP	Borja	50	43	12+27	31	3	5	2+1	3	1+4	4
19	FW	(Portugal) POR	Cardinal	46	39	20+15	27	3	3	0+3	1	3+2	8
3	FW	(Brazil) BRA	Humberto	41	21	9+24	20	2	0	0+1	0	0+5	1

=== Clean sheets ===
Last updated on 27 February 2016.

Place	Number	Name	Primera Division	Copa del Rey	Copa de Espana	UEFA Futsal Cup	Total
1	27	(Spain) Jesús Herrero	3	0	0	1	4
2	1	(Spain) Luis Amado	0	0	0	0	0
2	15	(Spain) Alejandro González Pérez	0	0	0	0	0
Totals			3	0	0	1	4

=== Hat-tricks ===
Last updated on 27 February 2016.

Date	No.	Name	Score	Against	Competition
3 October 2015	10	(Portugal) Ricardinho	6–5	(Spain) Magna Gurpea	Primera División
30 October 2015	3	(Brazil) Humberto ^{4}	4–4	(Spain) CD UMA Antequera	Primera División
13 November 2015	19	(Portugal) Cardinal	10–2	(France) Kremlin-Bicêtre United	UEFA Futsal Cup
4 December 2015	12	(Spain) Borja	5–2	(Spain) Jumilla B. Carchelo	Primera División
9 January 2016	12	(Spain) Borja	11–1	(Spain) Santiago	Primera División

Note

^{4} Player scored 4 goals
