= 2015–16 Copa del Rey de Futsal =

2015–16 Copa del Rey
Tournament details
- Country: Spain
- Teams: 42

Final positions
- Champions: ElPozo Murcia
- Runners-up: Palma Futsal

Tournament statistics
- Matches played: 38
- Goals scored: 284 (7.47 per match)

Awards
- Best player: Miguelín

The 2015–16 Copa del Rey was the 6th staging of the Copa del Rey de Futsal. The competition started on 22 September with First Round matches. The Final was held in Seville at Pabellón de San Pablo on 1 May 2016.

Movistar Inter was the defending champion but lost in Quarter-finals to Palma Futsal.

Eventually, ElPozo Murcia won its first ever Copa del Rey title after defeating Palma Futsal 3–2 in the Final.

== Calendar ==
Round	Date	Fixtures	Clubs	Notes
First round	22–23 September 2015	9	19 → 10	16 teams from Segunda División B + 4 teams from Segunda División gain entry.
Second round	29–30 September 2015	16	32 → 16	Primera División and 6 Segunda División's teams gain entry.
Round of 16	13–14 October 2015	8	16 → 8	
Quarter-finals	27 October 2015	4	8 → 4	
Semifinals	4 November 2015	4	4 → 2	
Semifinals	23 February 2016	4	4 → 2	
Final	7 May 2016	1	2 → 1	

== Qualified teams ==
- 14 teams of Primera División
- 10 teams of Segunda División
- 18 teams of Segunda División B

== First round ==
Draw was held on Tuesday, 8 September. Matches to be played on 22–23 September 2015.

Team 1	Score	Team 2
Universidad de Valladolid (Castile and León)	0–5	(Castile and León) Zamora
Mundoseguros Triana (Andalusia)	6−4	(Valencian Community) Hércules San Vicente
Atl. Mengíbar (Andalusia)	0–2	(Region of Murcia) Plásticos Romero
Silver Novanca (Community of Madrid)	w/o	Melilla
Profiltek Agüimes (Canary Islands)	14–4	(Canary Islands) Gomera
Aguas de Teror (Canary Islands)	1–9	(Castilla–La Mancha) Soliss Talavera
Mosteiro Bembrive (Galicia (Spain))	2–1	(Community of Madrid) Rivas
Riera Cornellà (Catalonia)	3–3	(Catalonia) Pallejà
Escola Pia (Catalonia)	6–3	(Aragon) Pinseque
Zierbena (Basque Country (autonomous community))	9–3	(Aragon) Colo-Colo

Teams qualified to next round
Zamora	Mundoseguros Triana	Plásticos Romero	Silver Novanca	Profiltek Agüimes
Soliss Talavera	Mosteiro Bembrive	Pallejà	Escola Pia	Zierbena

== Second round ==
Draw will take place on 24 September at RFEF headquarters. Draw included ten winners from the first round plus all Primera División and 6 remaining Segunda División teams.

Matches to be played on 29–30 September 2015.

Team 1	Score	Team 2
Mundoseguros Triana (Andalusia)	2–6	(Andalusia) Jaén Paraíso Interior
Silver Novanca (Community of Madrid)	3–2	(Valencian Community) Levante UD DM
Profiltek Agüimes (Canary Islands)	0–15	(Catalonia) FC Barcelona Lassa
Soliss Talavera (Castilla–La Mancha)	3–6	(Region of Murcia) ElPozo Murcia
Mosteiro Bembrive (Galicia (Spain))	4–2	(Galicia (Spain)) Santiago Futsal
Pallejà (Catalonia)	1–7	(Balearic Islands) Palma Futsal
Escola Pia (Catalonia)	5–6	(Catalonia) Catgas Energia Santa Coloma
Zierbena (Basque Country (autonomous community))	2–3	(Navarre) Aspil Vidal R.N.
Zamora (Castile and León)	1–8	(Aragon) D-Link Zaragoza
Plásticos Romero (Region of Murcia)	5–4	(Region of Murcia) Jumilla Bodegas Carchelo
Naturpellet Segovia (Castile and León)	3–3 (6–7p)	(Valencian Community) Peñíscola RehabMedic
Valdepeñas (Castilla–La Mancha)	3–2	(Valencian Community) Elche Vulcanizados Alberola
Gran Canaria (Canary Islands)	2–9	(Community of Madrid) Movistar Inter
Real Betis FSN (Andalusia)	7–4	(Andalusia) UMA Antequera
Cofersa O'Parrulo (Galicia (Spain))	1–3	(Galicia (Spain)) Burela Pescados Rubén
Cidade de Narón (Galicia (Spain))	3–8	(Navarre) Magna Gurpea

=== Matches ===
All times are CEST except for Canary Islands which are WEST.

29 September 2015	Cidade de Narón	3–8	Magna Gurpea	Narón
20:00 (UTC+2)	Rober 9'; Álex 21'; Bebeto 38'	Report	Ibarra 1'; Álex 2' (o.g.); Araça 5'; D Saldise 15'; Rafa Usín 26', 39'; Yoshikawa 34', 37'	Stadium: Pavillón A Gándara; Attendance: 150; Referee: Gallo Suárez, Velasco Martínez

29 September 2015	Zierbena	2–3	Aspil Vidal R.N.	Zierbena
20:00 (UTC+2)	Kike 36', 40'	Report	Joselito 11'; D Pazos 33', 40'	Stadium: Polideportivo Municipal; Attendance: 700; Referee: Egia Echearte, Urdánoz Apezteguía

29 September 2015	Escola Pia	5–6	Catgas Energia Santa Coloma	Sabadell
20:30 (UTC+2)	S Ruiz 25'; Jordi Torras 26'; Comadran 34', 35'; Sardà 37'	Report	R López 4'; D Salgado 19', 31', 34'; Fabián 27', 38'	Stadium: Pavelló CE Escola Pia; Referee: García Donas, Mamolar Calvo

29 September 2015	Mundoseguros Triana	2–6	Jaén Paraíso Interior	Seville
20:30 (UTC+2)	Bella 35'; Vera 35'	Report	Ossorio 6'; Rojas 8'; V Montes 31'; Boyis 36'; Emilio 37'; C Muñoz 40'	Stadium: Pabellón El Paraguas; Attendance: 600; Referee: Cotes García, Ramos Marín

29 September 2015	Naturpellet Segovia	3–3 (a.e.t.) (6–7 p)	Peñíscola RehabMedic	Segovia
20:30 (UTC+2)	Juanfran 2'; Buitre 23' (pen.); Edu 46'	Report	Josiko 7'; Verdejo 26', 44'; Tejel 8', ¿?'	Stadium: Pabellón Pedro Delgado; Attendance: 300; Referee: Contreras Tejedor, Miguel Velasco

29 September 2015	Silver Novanca	3–2	Levante UD DM	Leganés
20:30 (UTC+2)	Palomares 2', 35'; Diz 22'	Report	Charlie 33'; Carde 37'	Stadium: Pabellón de la Fortuna; Attendance: 500; Referee: Del Pozo García, Munez Carpintero

29 September 2015	Mosteiro Bembrive	4–2	Santiago Futsal	Vigo
21:00 (UTC+2)	Mario 9', 31'; Borrajo 37'; Fiou 39'	Report	Isma 14'; D Montes 39'	Stadium: Pavillón Vicente Álvárez; Referee: Ferrero Carballal, Martínez Torres

29 September 2015	Pallejà	1–7	Palma Futsal	Pallejà
21:00 (UTC+2)	O Santos 15'	Report	Chicho 6'; Tomaz 8'; Bruno Taffy 15', 23', 30'; Tripodi 34', 39'	Stadium: Poliesportiu Municipal; Referee: Mamolar Calvo, Moreno Millán

29 September 2015	Real Betis FSN	7–4	UMA Antequera	Dos Hermanas
21:00 (UTC+2)	Paco 6', 25'; Juanillo 7'; Migo 9', 38'; Miguel 29'; Miguel 35' (o.g.)	Report	Miguel 2'; Atienza 6'; Armando 16'; Fernando 17'	Stadium: Pabellón Francisco de Dios Jiménez; Attendance: 550; Referee: Elena Pedrós, Linares López

29 September 2015	Soliss Talavera	3–6	ElPozo Murcia	Talavera de la Reina
21:00 (UTC+2)	Cáceres 9', 11'; Chispa 22'	Report	Matteus 1'; R Campos 16', 29'; Adri 22'; Juampi 26'; Bebe 40'	Stadium: Pabellón 1º de Mayo; Attendance: 2,500; Referee: Martínez Segovia, Rodrigo Miguel

29 September 2015	Valdepeñas	3–2 (a.e.t.)	Elche Vulcanizados Alberola	Valdepeñas
21:00 (UTC+2)	Juanlu 2'; Contreras 39'; J Linares 42'	Report	Vicen 21'; O Ruiz 22'	Stadium: Pabellón Virgen de la Cabeza; Referee: Romero Candela, Sánchez Molina

29 September 2015	Zamora	1–8	D-Link Zaragoza	Zamora
21:00 (UTC+2)	Chicho ¿?'	Report	José Carlos 1', 3'; Retamar 3', ¿?', ¿?'; J Santos 8'; Tejel 8', ¿?'	Stadium: Pabellón Ángel Nieto; Referee: González Moreta, Sánchez Chamorro

30 September 2015	Gran Canaria	2–9	Movistar Inter	Las Palmas
21:00 (UTC+1)	V Cachón 14'; Bingyoba 8'	Report	Cardinal 7', 33'; Borja 10', 12', 26', 28'; Carlos Ortiz 31'; Rivillos 34'; Darlan 37'	Stadium: Centro Insular de Deportes; Referee: Díaz Rodríguez, Díaz Rodríguez

30 September 2015	Plásticos Romero	5–4 (a.e.t.)	Jumilla Bodegas Carchelo	Cartagena
21:00 (UTC+2)	Fran 14'; Dani Gómez 27'; Rahali 31', 32'; Dani Blanco 43'	Report	Orzáez 1', 2'; Macías 15'; Simón 31'	Stadium: Pabellón Wssell de Guimbarda; Attendance: 450; Referee: Fortes Pardo, Martínez Flores

6 October 2015	Cofersa O'Parrulo	1–3	Burela Pescados Rubén	Ferrol
20:00 (UTC+2)	Miguel 38'	Report	Chano 4', 19', 36'	Stadium: Pavillón A Malata; Attendance: 200; Referee: Cid Bragado, Ferreiro Carballal

6 October 2015	Profiltek Agüimes	0–15	FC Barcelona Lassa	Agüimes
20:30 (UTC+1)		Report	Lin 4'; Dyego 5', 17', 20'; Batería 13', 22'; S Lozano 14', 16', 28'; Gabriel 15'; Ferrão 18', 26', 38'; Juan Emilio 32', 38'	Stadium: Pabellón Municipal; Referee: Juan Manuel García, Abraham José Manrique

Teams qualified to next round
Jaén Paraíso Interior	Silver Novanca	ElPozo Murcia	Mosteiro Bembrive	Palma Futsal	Catgas Energia S.C.	Aspil Vidal R.N.	D-Link Zaragoza
Peñíscola RehabMedic	Valdepeñas	Real Betis FSN	Magna Gurpea	Movistar Inter	Plásticos Romero	Burela Pescados Rubén	FC Barcelona Lassa

== Round of 16 ==
Round of 16 draw was held on Friday 2 October at RFEF headquarters. This round draw includes the 16 winners from the Second Round, which in summary are 11 teams from Primera División, 3 from Segunda División and 2 from Segunda División B.

Matches to be played on 13/14 October 2015.

All times are CEST.

Team 1	Score	Team 2
Real Betis FSN (Andalusia)	2–4	(Community of Madrid) Movistar Inter
Silver Novanca (Community of Madrid)	3–4	(Valencian Community) Peñíscola RehabMedic
Mosteiro Bembrive (Galicia (Spain))	3–7	(Catalonia) Catgas Energia S.C.
Valdepeñas (Castilla–La Mancha)	0–2	(Balearic Islands) Palma Futsal
Plásticos Romero (Region of Murcia)	0–6	(Region of Murcia) ElPozo Murcia
FC Barcelona Lassa (Catalonia)	4–1	(Navarre) Magna Gurpea
Jaén Paraíso Interior (Andalusia)	3–2	(Aragon) D-Link Zaragoza
Aspil Vidal R.N. (Navarre)	3–2	(Galicia (Spain)) Burela Pescados Rubén

=== Matches ===
13 October 2015	Aspil Vidal R.N.	3–2	Burela Pescadon Rubén	Tudela
20:30 (UTC+2)	Hamza 15'; Pedro 21'; Andresito 23'	Report	Chino 34'; Iago 38'	Stadium: Polideportivo Ciudad de Tudela; Attendance: 500; Referee: Alonso Montesinos, Urdánoz Apezteguía

13 October 2015	Jaén Paraíso Interior	3–2	D-Link Zaragoza	Jaén
21:00 (UTC+2)	V Montes 12'; Cuco 24'; Rojas 40'	Report	José Carlos 2'; V Tejel 33'	Stadium: Pabellón La Salobreja; Attendance: 900; Referee: Cuesta Sánchez, García Morón

13 October 2015	Mosteiro Bembrive	3–7	Catgas Energia S.C.	Bembrive, Vigo
21:00 (UTC+2)	Morgade 5'; Nené 35'; Kele 38'	Report	Rafa López 2'; P del Moral 7'; Corvo 30', 37'; Sepe 33'; Rubén 35', 39'	Stadium: Pavillón Vicente Álvárez; Referee: Cid Bragado, Martínez Torres

13 October 2015	Plásticos Romero	0–6	ElPozo Murcia	Cartagena
21:00 (UTC+2)		Report	Lima 19'; Bebe 21'; Marinović 25', 27', 39'; R Campos 33'	Stadium: Pabellón Wssell de Guimbarda; Referee: Fortes Pardo, Martínez Flores

13 October 2015	Silver Novanca	3–4	Peñíscola RehabMedic	Leganés
21:00 (UTC+2)	Palomares 13'; Draku 15'; Morales 38'	Report	Míchel 12', 20', 23'; Álex Verdejo 29'	Stadium: Pabellón de la Fortuna; Referee: Del Pozo García, Múnez Carpintero

13 October 2015	Valdepeñas	0–2	Palma Futsal	Valdepeñas
21:00 (UTC+2)		Report	Tomaz 25'; Bruno Taffy 40'	Stadium: Pabellón Virgen de la Cabeza; Referee: Rodrigo Miguel, Sánchez Molina

13 October 2015	FC Barcelona Lassa	4–1	Magna Gurpea	Barcelona
21:15 (UTC+2)	S Lozano 2'; Ferrão 13'; Aicardo 37'; Wilde 39'	Report	Saldise 32'	Stadium: Palau Blaugrana; Referee: García Donas, Moreno Millán

14 October 2015	Real Betis FSN	2–4	Movistar Inter	Seville
21:00 (UTC+2)	Juanillo 18'; Paco 34'	Report	Darlan 4'; Cardinal 17'; Borja 22'; C Ortiz 39'	Stadium: Palacio de Deportes; Attendance: 5,121; Referee: Cordero Gallardo, Linares López

Teams qualified to next round
Aspil Vidal R.N.	Jaén Paraíso Interior	Catgas Energia S.C.	ElPozo Murcia
Peñíscola RehabMedic	Palma Futsal	FC Barcelona Lassa	Movistar Inter

== Quarter finals ==
Quarter-finals draw took place on 16 October 2015, at the RFEF headquarters.

Matches to be played on 27 October 2015.

All times are CET.

Team 1	Score	Team 2
Aspil Vidal R.N. (Navarre)	3–2	(Catalonia) Catgas Energia S.C.
Movistar Inter (Community of Madrid)	1–2	(Balearic Islands) Palma Futsal
Jaén Paraíso Interior (Andalusia)	0–4	(Region of Murcia) ElPozo Murcia
FC Barcelona Lassa (Catalonia)	6–2	(Valencian Community) Peñíscola RehabMedic

=== Matches ===
27 October 2015	Aspil Vidal R.N.	3–2	Catgas Energia S.C.	Tudela
20:30 (UTC+1)	Pedro 9'; Andresito 25', 37'	Report	Fabián 5'; Sepe 28'	Stadium: Polideportivo Ciudad de Tudela; Attendance: 600; Referee: Alonso Montesinos, Urdánoz Apezteguía

27 October 2015	FC Barcelona Lassa	6–2	Peñíscola RehabMedic	Barcelona
21:00 (UTC+1)	Batería 2', 24'; Dyego 26'; Lin 32'; Wilde 36'; Aicardo 37'	Report	Martel 20'; Míchel 39'	Stadium: Palau Blaugrana; Attendance: 911; Referee: García Donas, Moreno Millán

27 October 2015	Jaén Paraíso Interior	0–4	ElPozo Murcia	Jaén
21:00 (UTC+1)		Report	Miguelín 2'; Lolo Suazo 5'; Álex 20'; José Ruiz 38'	Stadium: Pabellón La Salobreja; Attendance: 1,100; Referee: Cuesta Sánchez, García Morón

27 October 2015	Movistar Inter	1–2	Palma Futsal	Torrejón de Ardoz
21:00 (UTC+1)	Rivillos 1'	Report	Vadillo 35'; Pizarro 40'	Stadium: Pabellón Jorge Garbajosa; Referee: Gutiérrez Lumbreras, Lope Díaz

Teams qualified to next round
Aspil Vidal R.N.	FC Barcelona Lassa
ElPozo Murcia	Palma Futsal

== Semifinals ==
Semi-finals draw took place on 29 October 2015, at the RFEF headquarters.

First leg matches to be played on 4 November 2015 and second leg on 24 February 2016.

All times are CET.

Team 1	Agg.	Team 2	1st leg	2nd leg
FC Barcelona Lassa (Catalonia)	4–6	(Balearic Islands) Palma Futsal	1–2	3–4
Aspil Vidal R.N. (Navarre)	4–11	(Region of Murcia) ElPozo Murcia	1–8	3–3

=== Matches ===
==== 1st leg ====
November 4, 2015	Aspil Vidal R.N.	1–8	ElPozo Murcia	Tudela
20:30 (UTC+1)	Andresito 32'	Report	Marinović 3'; Álex 4'; Lima 11', 16'; Raúl Campos 19', 21', 32'; Adri 23'	Stadium: Polideportivo Ciudad de Tudela; Referee: Gallo Suárez, Velasco Martínez

November 10, 2015	FC Barcelona Lassa	1–2	Palma Futsal	Barcelona
21:00 (UTC+1)	Lin 16'	Report	Pizarro 3'; Bruno Taffy 36'	Stadium: Palau Blaugrana; Referee: García Donas, Moreno Millán

==== 2nd leg ====
February 23, 2016	Palma Futsal	4–3 (6–4 agg.)	FC Barcelona Lassa	Palma de Mallorca
20:45 (UTC+1)	Pizarro 4'; Bruno Taffy 17'; Vadillo 25'; João Batista 36'	Report	Tolrà 6', 33'; Wilde 38'	Stadium: Son Moix; Attendance: 3,800; Referee: Juan Cerdá, Martínez García

February 23, 2016	ElPozo Murcia	3–3 (11–4 agg.)	Aspil Vidal R.N.	Murcia
21:00 (UTC+1)	Lima 4'; Jê 10'; Bebe 26'	Report	Rubi 1'; David 10'; Joselito 11'	Stadium: Palacio de Deportes; Referee: López Jiménez, Martínez Flores

Teams qualified to Final
Palma Futsal	ElPozo Murcia

== Final ==
The final will be played on 7 May at the Pabellón San Pablo located in Seville.

May 7, 2016	ElPozo Murcia	3–2 (a.e.t.)	Palma Futsal	Seville
13:00 (UTC+2)	Jê 11'; Álex 32'; Miguelín 46'	Report	Bruno Taffy 23'; Sergio 29'	Stadium: Pabellón San Pablo; Attendance: 5,000; Referee: Gutiérrez Lumbreras, Peña Díaz

2015–16 Copa del Rey de Futsal winners
(Region of Murcia)
ElPozo Murcia
First title

== See also ==
- 2015–16 Primera División de Futsal
- 2015 Copa de España de Futsal
