= 2014–15 Copa del Rey de Futsal =

2014–15 Copa del Rey
Tournament details
- Country: Spain
- Teams: 48

Final positions
- Champions: Inter Movistar (1st title)
- Runners-up: Marfil Santa Coloma

Tournament statistics
- Matches played: 43
- Goals scored: 312 (7.26 per match)

The 2014–15 Copa del Rey was the 5th staging of the Copa del Rey de Futsal. The competition began on 23 and 24 September 2013 with First round matches. The Final took place on 2 May at Pabellón Diego Calvo Valera, in Águilas, Region of Murcia.

Barcelona Alusport is the defending champion after winning its fourth title in previous edition but will not able to defend its title after they were defeated in Semifinals to Inter Movistar.

In the Final, Inter Movistar won 3–0 to Marfil Santa Coloma clinching its first Copa del Rey title.

== Calendar ==
Round	Date	Fixtures	Clubs	Notes
First round	23–27 September 2014	10	20 → 10	19 teams from Segunda División B + 2 teams from Segunda División gain entry.
Second round	13–15 October 2014	16	32 → 16	Primera División and 10 Segunda División's teams gain entry.
Round of 16	4/5 November 2014	8	16 → 8	
Quarter-finals	9/10 December 2014	4	8 → 4	
Semifinals	14 January	4	4 → 2	
Semifinals	3/4 February	4	4 → 2	
Final	2 May	1	2 → 1	

== Qualified teams ==
- 16 teams of Primera División
- 12 teams of Segunda División
- 20 teams of Segunda División B

== First round ==
Draw was held on Saturday, 6 September. Matches played on 23–27 September 2014.

All times are CEST.

Team 1	Score	Team 2
Noia (Galicia (Spain))	7–6	(Galicia (Spain)) O'Parrulo
Cidade de Narón (Galicia (Spain))	3–3 (3–5p)	(Galicia (Spain)) Mosteiro Bembrive
L'Hospitalet Bellsport (Catalonia)	4–5	(Catalonia) Escola Pia
Pallejà (Catalonia)	2–1	(Catalonia) La Unión
San Juan (Navarre)	1–2	(Basque Country (autonomous community)) Concepto Egile
Pinseque (Aragon)	5–6	(Castilla–La Mancha) Brihuega
Profiltek Agüimes (Canary Islands)	1–6	(Community of Madrid) Leganés
Las Cuevecitas (Canary Islands)	3–2	(Canary Islands) Malta97 Las Palmas
Coineña (Andalusia)	7–4	(Andalusia) UMA Antequera
Manzanares (Castilla–La Mancha)	2–4	(Andalusia) Real Betis FSN

Teams qualified to next round
Noia	Mosteiro Bembrive	Escola Pia	Pallejà	Concepto Egile
Brihuega	Leganés	Las Cuevecitas	Coineña	Real Betis FSN

== Second round ==
Draw took place on 26 September at RFEF headquarters. Draw included ten winners from the first round plus all Primera División and 10 remaining Segunda División teams.

Matches played on 13–15 October 2014.

Team 1	Score	Team 2
Noia (Galicia (Spain))	2–3	(Galicia (Spain)) Santiago
Concepto Egile (Basque Country (autonomous community))	3–5 (a.e.t.)	(Aragon) D-Link Zaragoza
Segovia (Castile and León)	4–3 (a.e.t.)	(Navarre) Aspil Vidal R.N.
Brihuega (Castilla–La Mancha)	1–5	(Community of Madrid) Inter Movistar
Escola Pia (Catalonia)	0–7	(Catalonia) FC Barcelona
Pallejà (Catalonia)	2–5	(Catalonia) Marfil Santa Coloma
Valdepeñas (Castilla–La Mancha)	2–5	(Navarre) Magna Navarra
Elche (Valencian Community)	3–2	(Region of Murcia) Montesinos Jumilla
Hércules San Vicente (Valencian Community)	2–3	(Region of Murcia) ElPozo Murcia
Real Betis FSN (Andalusia)	3–1	(Andalusia) Jaén Paraíso Interior
Coineña (Andalusia)	2–6	(Valencian Community) Levante UD DM
Melilla	1–6	(Valencian Community) Peñíscola Bodegas Dunviro
G.C. Colegios Arenas (Canary Islands)	5–3 (a.e.t.)	(Canary Islands) Uruguay Tenerife
Las Cuevecitas (Canary Islands)	6–0	(Galicia (Spain)) Azkar Lugo
Mosteiro Bembrive (Galicia (Spain))	5–4 (a.e.t.)	(Galicia (Spain)) Burela Pescados Rubén
Leganés (Community of Madrid)	3–5	(Balearic Islands) Palma Futsal

Teams qualified to next round
Santiago	D-Link Zaragoza	Segovia	Inter Movistar	FC Barcelona	Marfil Santa Coloma	Magna Navarra	Elche
ElPozo Murcia	Real Betis FSN	Levante UD DM	Peñíscola Bodegas Dunviro	G.C. Colegios Arenas	Las Cuevecitas	Mosteiro Bembrive	Palma Futsal

== Round of 16 ==
Round of 16 draw took place on 21 October at RFEF headquarters. This round draw includes the 16 winners from the Round of 32 which in summary are 10 teams from Primera División, 3 from Segunda División and 3 from Segunda División B.

Matches to be played on 4 and 5 November 2014.

All times are CET.

Team 1	Score	Team 2
Real Betis FSN (Andalusia)	5–3	(Valencian Community) Levante UD DM
Las Cuevecitas (Canary Islands)	1–4	(Balearic Islands) Palma Futsal
Mosteiro Bembrive (Galicia (Spain))	2–12	(Catalonia) FC Barcelona
Segovia (Castile and León)	1–2	(Aragon) D-Link Zaragoza
Elche (Valencian Community)	1–4	(Community of Madrid) Inter Movistar
G.C. Colegios Arenas (Canary Islands)	4–5	(Catalonia) Marfil Santa Coloma
Santiago (Galicia (Spain))	6–6 (5–4p)	(Navarre) Magna Navarra
ElPozo Murcia (Region of Murcia)	7–3	(Valencian Community) Peñíscola Bodegas Dunviro

=== Matches ===
4 November 2014	G.C. Colegios Arenas	4–5	Marfil Santa Coloma	Las Palmas de Gran Canaria
20:00 (UTC±0)	S García 8'; Pablo Pérez 17'; Juanillo 30'; Galindo 34'	Report	Dani Salgado 2', 23', 35'; Adolfo 36'; E Martel 38'	Stadium: Centro Insular de Deportes; Attendance: 350; Referee: Díaz Rodríguez, Vicente & Juan

4 November 2014	Las Cuevecitas	1–4	Palma Futsal	Candelaria, Tenerife
20:30 (UTC±0)	Cristian 25'	Report	Bruno Taffy 1', 16'; Lemine 9'; Vadillo 22'	Stadium: Pabellón Pedro Manuel Brito Guanche; Referee: García Hernández, Mendoza Martínez

4 November 2014	Santiago	6–6 (5–4 p)	Magna Navarra	Santiago de Compostela
20:30 (UTC+1)	Gallego Rodríguez 12', 20'; Tallón 29'; Santi 32'; L Bolo 39'; D Quintela 44'	Report	R Martil 15'; J Eseverri 18', 38'; Jesulito 40', 40'; M Tolrà 44'	Stadium: Pabellón Fontes do Sar; Attendance: 400; Referee: Martínez Torres, Montero Garrido
	Penalties
	D Quintela (penalty scored); L Bolo (penalty scored); Gallego Rodríguez (penalty scored); Santi (penalty scored); Kristijan (penalty scored)		(penalty scored) Jesulito; (penalty scored) M Tolrà; (penalty scored) J Eseverri; (penalty scored) R Martil; (penalty missed) J Saldise

5 November 2014	Segovia	1–2	D-Link Zaragoza	Segovia
20:30 (UTC+1)	Charly 37'	Report	Catela 23', 24'	Stadium: Pabellón Ángel Nieto; Attendance: 400; Referee: Contreras Tejedor, Viedma Martín

5 November 2014	Elche	1–4	Inter Movistar	Elche
21:00 (UTC+1)	Pitu 31' (pen.)	Report	Rivillos 24'; D Pazos 33'; Cardinal 38'; Pola 39'	Stadium: Pabellón Esperanza Lag; Attendance: 1,200; Referee: Rabadán Sainz, González Ruano

5 November 2014	ElPozo Murcia	7–3	Peñíscola Bodegas Dunviro	Murcia
21:00 (UTC+1)	Bebe 6'; R Campos 7', 16'; Franklin 10', 26'; Lima 26', 38'	Report	C Anós 1', 35'; Juanqui 33'	Stadium: Palacio de Deportes; Attendance: 1,000; Referee: Fortes Pardo, Martínez Flores

5 November 2014	Mosteiro Bembrive	2–12	FC Barcelona	Vigo
21:00 (UTC+1)	Mariokele 22'; Carlos Cora 38'	Report	Wilde 3', 19'; Aicardo 8'; Lin 11'; Batería 14', 15', 32'; S Lozano 23', 33', 34'; Gabriel 27'; Ari 39'	Stadium: Pavillón de As Travesas; Attendance: 4,000; Referee: Cid Bragado, Ferrero Carballal

5 November 2014	Real Betis FSN	5–3	Levante UD DM	Dos Hermanas
21:00 (UTC+1)	Miguel 2', 12'; Borja 33'; Migo 35'; Wallace 38'	Report	Carlitos 23'; Puertas 36'; J Lledó 37'	Stadium: Pabellón Francisco de Dios Jiménez; Attendance: 1,400; Referee: Elena Pedrós, Moreno Reina

Teams qualified to next round
Marfil Santa Coloma	Palma Futsal	Santiago	D-Link Zaragoza
Inter Movistar	ElPozo Murcia	FC Barcelona	Real Betis FSN

== Quarter finals ==
Quarter-finals draw took place on 12 November 2014, at the RFEF headquarters.

Matches to be played on 9/10 December 2014.

All times are CET.

Team 1	Score	Team 2
Real Betis FSN (Andalusia)	2–9	(Region of Murcia) ElPozo Murcia
Santiago (Galicia (Spain))	2–5	(Community of Madrid) Inter Movistar
FC Barcelona (Catalonia)	5–1	(Aragon) D-Link Zaragoza
Marfil Santa Coloma (Catalonia)	5–4	(Balearic Islands) Palma Futsal

=== Matches ===
9 December 2014	Marfil Santa Coloma	5–4	Palma Futsal	Santa Coloma de Gramenet
20:30 (UTC+1)	E Martel 17', 18'; Dani Salgado 31'; Adolfo 33', 37'	Report	Sergio 3', 4', 19'; Tomaz 12'	Stadium: Pavelló Nou; Referee: Pons Rodríguez, Sarrat Nuevo

9 December 2014	Santiago	2–5	Inter Movistar	Santiago de Compostela
21:00 (UTC+1)	I Rumbo 24'; Marci 36'	Report	Rivillos 5', 6'; D Pazos 9'; Cardinal 13'; L Amado 22'	Stadium: Fontes do Sar; Referee: Contreras Tejedor, Pérez Álvarez

10 December 2014	FC Barcelona	5–1	D-Link Zaragoza	Barcelona
19:00 (UTC+1)	Gabriel 1'; Saad 3'; Sergio Lozano 12'; Wilde 13'; Álex 17' (o.g.)	Report	Víctor Tejel 27'	Stadium: Palau Blaugrana; Referee: Bel Pascual, Felipe Madorrán

16 December 2014	Real Betis FSN	2–9	ElPozo Murcia	Seville
21:00 (UTC+1)	Paco 27'; Migo 30'	Report	Adri 3'; Raúl Campos 12', 24'; Gréllo 18', 38'; Bebe 22'; Álex 34'; Miguelín 35'; Juampi 39'	Stadium: Palacio San Pablo; Attendance: 6,000; Referee: Peña Diaz, Peña Gomez

Teams qualified to next round
Marfil Santa Coloma	Inter Movistar
FC Barcelona	ElPozo Murcia

== Semi finals ==
Semi-finals draw to be held on 18 December 2014, at the RFEF headquarters.

First leg matches to be played on 14 January 2015 and second leg on 4 February.

All times are CET.

Team 1	Agg.	Team 2	1st leg	2nd leg
Marfil Santa Coloma (Catalonia)	11–10	(Region of Murcia) ElPozo Murcia	6–3	5–7
Inter Movistar (Community of Madrid)	9–5	(Catalonia) FC Barcelona	4–2	5–3

=== Matches ===
==== 1st leg ====
January 14, 2015	Marfil Santa Coloma	6–3	ElPozo Murcia	Santa Coloma de Gramenet
20:30 (UTC+1)	E Martel 16', 18', 31'; Dani Salgado 23'; A Segura 35'; Rubén 36'	Report	Adri 35'; Lima 37', 37'	Stadium: Pavelló Nou; Referee: Alonso Montesinos, Santander Flamarique

January 14, 2015	Inter Movistar	4–2	FC Barcelona	Alcalá de Henares
21:00 (UTC+1)	Lolo 17'; Cardinal 24', 37'; D Pazos 24'	Report	Saad 8'; Sergio Lozano 25'	Stadium: Pabellón Fundación Montemadrid; Attendance: 4,000; Referee: Rodrigo Miguel, Sánchez Molina

==== 2nd leg ====
February 3, 2015	FC Barcelona	3–5 (5–9 agg.)	Inter Movistar	Barcelona
21:15 (UTC+1)	Wilde 7'; Batería 29'; Rafa Usín 32'	Report	Pola 6'; Cardinal 11'; Daniel 26'; Ricardinho 27'; Lolo 38'	Stadium: Palau Blaugrana; Attendance: 4,566; Referee: Felipe Madorrán, Gereta Ramírez

February 4, 2015	ElPozo Murcia	7–5 (10–11 agg.)	Marfil Santa Coloma	Murcia
21:00 (UTC+1)	Adri 4'; Lima 6', 35'; Franklin 7'; Álex 11'; Bebe 23'; Raúl Campos 26'	Report	Dani Salgado 5', 28', 32'; Sepe 34'; Adolfo 37'	Stadium: Palacio de Deportes; Attendance: 5,500; Referee: Cuesta Sánchez, García Morón

Teams qualified to Final
Inter Movistar	Marfil Santa Coloma

=== Final ===
The final was played on 2 May at the Pabellón Diego Calvo Valera in Águilas, Region of Murcia.

May 2, 2015	Marfil Santa Coloma	0–3	Inter Movistar	Águilas
20:15 (UTC+2)		Report	Pola 21'; Luis Amado 38'; Cardinal 40'	Stadium: Diego Calvo Valera; Attendance: 1,700; Referee: Fortes Pardo, Martínez Flórez

2014–15 Copa del Rey de Futsal winners
(Community of Madrid)
Inter Movistar
First title

== See also ==
- 2014–15 Primera División de Futsal
- 2014 Copa de España de Futsal
