= 2015–16 Primera División de Futsal =

Primera División
- Season: 2015–16
- Champions: Movistar Inter (11th)
- Relegated: Elche CF; UMA Antequera
- Matches: 240
- Goals: 1,710 (7.13 per match)
- Top goalscorer: Juan Carlos (Peñíscola RehabMedic) – 34 goals
- Biggest home win: Inter Movistar 11–1 Santiago (Rd.18)
- Biggest away win: Elche CF 3–12 FC Barcelona Lassa (Rd. 30)
- Highest scoring: Elche CF 3–12 FC Barcelona Lassa (Rd. 30)
- Longest winning run: 12 matches Movistar Inter
- Longest unbeaten run: 20 matches Movistar Inter
- Longest winless run: 15 matches UMA Antequera
- Longest losing run: 9 matches Elche CFS

The 2015–16 season of the Primera División de Fútbol Sala was the 27th season of top-tier futsal in Spain. It was the fifth season under the "Primera División" name. The regular season started on September 11, 2015, and ended on April 30, 2016. The championship playoffs followed the end of the regular season.

Inter Movistar are the defending champions by defeating ElPozo Murcia 3 games to 1 in the 2014–15 Championship Final series, winning its tenth title overall and second in a row.

Uruguay Tenerife and Prone Lugo finished in the last two places in the league and so were relegated at the end of the 2014-2015 regular season. UMA Antequera were crowned 2014-2015 champions of Segunda División de Futsal and were promoted automatically. Elche lost the promotion playoffs 2 games to 0 to CD Brihuega FS, but because of money issues Elche became the other team to be promoted to the Primera División for the 2015-2016 season.

== Teams ==
Location of teams in Primera División 2015–16

Team	Location	Stadium	Capacity
Movistar Inter	Torrejón de Ardoz	Jorge Garbajosa	2,900
ElPozo Murcia	Murcia	Palacio de Deportes	7,500
FC Barcelona Lassa	Barcelona	Palau Blaugrana	7,500
Catgas Energia S.C.	Santa Coloma de Gramenet	Pavelló Nou	2,200
Magna Gurpea	Pamplona	Polideportivo Anaitasuna	3,000
Jumilla B. Carchelo	Jumilla	Carlos García Ruiz	1,000
Burela Pescados Rubén	Burela	Vista Alegre	1,040
Aspil Vidal R.N.	Tudela	Ciudad de Tudela	1,200
Santiago Futsal	Santiago de Compostela	Fontes do Sar	6,000
Jaén Paraíso Interior	Jaén	La Salobreja	1,200
Palma Futsal	Palma de Mallorca	Son Moix	4,116
Peñíscola RehabMedic	Peñíscola	Pabellón Municipal	2,000
Elche V. Alberola	Elche	Pabellón Esperanza Lag	2,000
D-Link Zaragoza	Zaragoza	Pabellón Siglo XXI	2,500
Levante UD DM	Valencia	El Cabanyal	1,000
UMA Antequera	Antequera	Fernando Argüelles	2,575

== Regular season ==
=== Standings ===
Pos	Team	Pld	W	D	L	GF	GA	GD	Pts	Qualification or relegation
1	Movistar Inter	30	27	2	1	160	57	+103	83	Qualification to the championship playoffs
2	FC Barcelona Lassa	30	23	5	2	157	78	+79	74	Qualification to the championship playoffs
3	ElPozo Murcia	30	19	6	5	130	81	+49	63	Qualification to the championship playoffs
4	Palma Futsal	30	17	6	7	107	80	+27	57	Qualification to the championship playoffs
5	Aspil Vidal R.N.	30	14	10	6	91	75	+16	52	Qualification to the championship playoffs
6	Magna Gurpea	30	14	6	10	111	85	+26	48	Qualification to the championship playoffs
7	Catgas Energia S.C.	30	12	8	10	123	124	−1	44	Qualification to the championship playoffs
8	Peñíscola RehabMedic	30	12	5	13	117	116	+1	41	Qualification to the championship playoffs
9	Burela Pescados Rubén	30	12	4	14	92	108	−16	40	
10	Santiago Futsal	30	8	7	15	99	119	−20	31	
11	DLink Zaragoza	30	8	7	15	108	119	−11	31	
12	Jaén Paraíso Interior	30	5	13	12	86	111	−25	28	
13	Levante UD DM	30	6	5	19	72	128	−56	23	
14	Jumilla B. Carchelo	30	5	6	19	85	135	−50	21	
15	Elche V. Alberola	30	4	5	21	75	156	−81	17	Relegation to Segunda División
16	UMA Antequera	30	4	5	21	97	138	−41	17	Relegation to Segunda División

Updated to match(es) played on 29 April 2016. Source: LNFS – Primera División and lnfs.es

=== Results ===
Rd. 1		1st Match	Rd. 16
11 Sept.	3–4	Magna Gurpea - Palma	4–5	22 Dec.
11 Sept.	5–6	Zaragoza - FC Barcelona	4–7	22 Dec.
11 Sept.	4–0	Elche - Antequera	8–3	22 Dec.
11 Sept.	4–5	Jumilla - ElPozo Murcia	1–2	22 Dec.
12 Sept.	2–3	Jaen-Movistar Inter	0–7	22 Dec.
12 Sept.	4–5	Peniscola - Santiago	3–1	22 Dec.
12 Sept.	2–2	Burela - Ribera Navarra	2–4	22 Dec.
12 Sept.	7–2	Santa Coloma - Levante	2–3	22 Dec.

Rd. 2		2nd Match	Rd. 17
18 Sept.	9–1	FC Barcelona - Jumilla	3–3	2 Jan.
18 Sept.	3–1	Palma - Burela	2–1	3 Jan.
18 Sept.	1–2	Antequera - Zaragoza	4–4	3 Jan.
18 Sept.	5–1	ElPozo Murcia - Santa Coloma	5–5	3 Jan.
18 Sept.	1–1	Levante - Jaén	2–2	3 Jan.
19 Sept.	4–4	Santiago - Magna Gurpea	4–4	4 Jan.
19 Sept.	4–2	Ribera Navarra - Elche	8–2	4 Jan.
19 Sept.	9–4	Movistar Inter - Peñíscola	4–1	4 Jan.

Rd. 3		3rd Match	Rd. 18
25 Sep.	2–1	Magna Gurpea - Burela	3–2	8 Jan.
25 Sep.	5–4	Jumilla - Antequera	6–3	8 Jan.
25 Sep.	4–4	Zaragoza - Ribera Navarra	0–2	9 Jan.
25 Sep.	2–4	Santiago - Inter	1–11	9 Jan.
26 Sep.	2–2	Jae¡én - ElPozo Murcia	1–3	9 Jan.
26 Sep.	3–6	Elche - Palma	1–6	8 Jan.
26 Sep.	6–7	Santa Colma - FC Barcelona	2–5	8 Jan.
26 Sep.	2–2	Peñíscola - Levante	6–2	8 Jan.

Rd. 4		4th Match	Rd. 19
2 Oct.	3–2	Levante - Santiago	2–3	15 Jan.
2 Oct.	2–2	Palma - Zaragoza	6–5	15 Jan.
2 Oct.	6–6	Antequera - Santa Coloma	6–6	15 Jan.
2 Oct.	6–1	FC Barcelona - Jaen	7–3	15 Jan.
3 Oct.	3–2	Burela - Elche	2–3	15 Jan.
3 Oct.	6–4	Ribera Navarra - Jumilla	1–3	16 Jan.
3 Oct.	5–2	ElPozo Murcia - Peñíscola	5–4	16 Jan.
3 Oct.	6–5	Inter - Magna Gurpea	5–3	16 Jan.

Rd. 5		5th Match	Rd. 20
9 Oct.	5–2	Santa Colma - Ribera Navarra	3–3	20 Jan.
9 Oct.	1–2	Jumilla - Palma	2–7	20 Jan.
9 Oct.	5–6	Jaén – Antequera	5–1	23 Jan.
9 Oct.	2–2	Santiago – ElPozo Murcia	6–5	19 Jan.
10 Oct.	2–7	Peñíscola - FC Barcelona	1–5	19 Jan.
10 Oct.	6–2	Zaragoza - Burela	3–6	20 Jan.
10 Oct.	7–5	Magna Gurpea - Elche	7–2	20 Jan.
10 Oct.	7–0	Inter - Levante	7–1	20 Jan.

Rd. 6		6th Match	Rd. 21
16 Oct.	1–7	Levante - Magna Gurpea	3–4	19 Feb.
16 Oct.	2–3	Elche - Zaragoza	1–1	19 Feb.
16 Oct.	2–5	Antequera - Peñíscola	3–6	20 Feb.
16 Oct.	4–2	FC Barcelona - Santiago	7–4	20 Feb.
17 Oct.	2–2	Palma - Santa Colma	5–5	19 Feb.
17 Oct.	6–6	Burela - Jumilla	5–1	19 Feb.
17 Oct.	3–0	Ribera Navarra - Jaén	8–3	20 Feb.
17 Oct.	2–3	ElPozo Murcia - Inter	2–3	20 Feb.

Rd. 7		7th Match	Rd. 22
23 Oct.	5–8	Santa Coloma - Burela	6–1	27 Feb.
23 Oct.	1–4	Levante - ElPozo Murcia	3–8	26 Feb.
23 Oct.	4–1	Santiago - Antequera	3–11	26 Feb.
23 Oct.	2–3	Jumilla - Elche	1–1	26 Feb.
24 Oct.	5–2	Jaén - Palma	1–5	26 Feb.
24 Oct.	3–1	Inter - FC Barcelona	1–7	27 Feb.
24 Oct.	2–2	Peñíscola - Ribera Navarra	3–4	27 Feb.
24 Oct.	4–1	Magna Gurpea - Zaragoza	4–1	28 Feb.

Rd. 8		8th Match	Rd. 23
30 Oct.	8–2	Palma - Peñíscola	4–5	5 Mar.
30 Oct.	4–4	Antequera - Inter	1–7	5 Mar.
30 Oct.	1–5	Elche - Santa Coloma	2–6	4 Mar.
30 Oct.	2–4	ElPozo Murcia - Magna Gurpea	3–0	4 Mar.
30 Oct.	4–0	FC Barcelona - Levante	6–2	4 Mar.
31 Oct.	8–2	Zaragoza - Jumilla	7–6	4 Mar.
31 Oct.	5–2	Ribera Navarra - Santiago	2–1	5 Mar.
31 Oct.	3–3	Burela - Jaén	3–3	5 Mar.

Rd. 9		9th Match	Rd. 24
6 Nov.	4–2	Levante - Antequera	1–6	19 Mar.
6 Nov.	3–1	Santa Coloma - Zaragoza	0–6	18 Mar.
6 Nov.	1–3	Santiago - Palma	2–3	18 Mar.
7 Nov.	3–7	El Pozo Murcia - FC Barcelona	4–4	18 Mar.
7 Nov.	4–4	Jaén - Elche	3–3	18 Mar.
7 Nov.	4–7	Peñíscola - Burela	2–3	19 Mar.
7 Nov.	3–3	Magna Gurpea - Jumilla	1–1	18 Mar.
7 Nov.	2–1	Inter - Ribera Navarra	2–2	18 Mar.

Rd. 10		10th Match	Rd. 25
6 Oct.	2–6	Palma - Inter	3–6	26 Mar.
13 Nov.	3–3	Zaragoza - Jaén	4–4	26 Mar.
13 Nov.	1–6	Elche - Peñíscola	2–11	26 Mar.
13 Nov.	4–3	FC Barcelona - Magna Gurpea	4–2	25 Mar.
13 Nov.	4–6	Jumilla - Santa Coloma	4–5	24 Mar.
14 Nov.	2–4	Antequera - ElPozo Murcia	0–6	26 Mar.
14 Nov.	4–3	Burela - Santiago	4–1	26 Mar.
14 Nov.	3–3	Ribera Navarra - Levante	3–2	25 Mar.

Rd. 11		11th Match	Rd. 26
20 Nov.	3–2	Levante - Palma	2–3	1 Apr.
20 Nov.	10–3	Magna Gurpea - Santa Coloma	2–4	1 Apr.
20 Nov.	3–1	Peñíscola - Zaragoza	6–2	1 Apr.
20 Nov.	5–5	FC Barcelona - Antequera	5–4	1 Apr.
20 Nov.	10–1	Santiago - Elche	4–2	1 Apr.
20 Nov.	3–3	ElPozo Murcia - Ribera Navarra	5–2	2 Apr.
20 Nov.	5–2	Jaén - Jumilla	5–3	2 Apr.
21 Nov.	6–0	Inter - Burela	4–1	2 Apr.

Rd. 12		12th Match	Rd. 27
24 Nov.	2–7	Elche - Inter	1–5	8 Apr.
24 Nov.	0–2	Ribera Navarra - FC Barcelona	4–4	8 Apr.
24 Nov.	5–1	Burela - Levante	4–2	8 Apr.
24 Nov.	0–2	Antequera - Magna Gurpea	4–6	8 Apr.
24 Nov.	3–5	Palma - ElPozo Murcia	2–2	9 Apr.
24 Nov.	3–7	Jumilla - Peñíscola	2–3	9 Apr.
25 Nov.	4–4	Santa Coloma - Jaén	4–4	9 Apr.
25 Nov.	5–5	Zaragoza - Santiago	3–4	8 Apr.

Rd. 13		13th Match	Rd. 28
27 Nov.	3–4	Antequera - Ribera Navarra	3–4	16 Apr.
27 Nov.	8–3	ElPozo Murcia - Burela	8–1	16 Apr.
28 Nov.	2–2	FC Barcelona - Palma	1–2	17 Apr.
28 Nov.	1–1	Santiago - Jumilla	3–4	15 Apr.
28 Nov.	3–4	Peñíscola - Santa Coloma	5–6	15 Apr.
28 Nov.	2–0	Magna Gurpea - Jaén	2–3	15 Apr.
28 Nov.	8–2	Inter - Zaragoza	7–4	15 Apr.
28 Nov.	7–3	Levante - Elche	4–4	15 Apr.

Rd. 14		14th Match	Rd. 29
3 Dec.	1–1	Magna Gurpea - Ribera Navarra	2–3	24 Apr.
4 Dec.	5–1	Palma - Antequera	3–5	22 Apr.
4 Dec.	5–6	Santa Coloma - Santiago	6–5	22 Apr.
4 Dec.	6–2	Zaragoza - Levante	8–5	22 Apr.
4 Dec.	5–5	Jaén - Peñíscola	3–4	23 Apr.
4 Dec.	2–5	Jumilla - Inter	1–11	29 Mar.
5 Dec.	1–5	Elche - ElPozo Murcia	4–7	22 Apr.
5 Dec.	0–5	Burela - FC Barcelona	3–4	22 Apr.

Rd. 15		15th Match	Rd. 30
18 Dec.	3–4	Antequera - Burela	3–5	29 Apr.
18 Dec.	4–2	ElPozo Murcia - Zaragoza	6–5	29 Apr.
18 Dec.	7–3	FC Barcelona - Elche	12–3	29 Apr.
18 Dec.	6–4	Levante - Jumilla	2–3	29 Apr.
18 Dec.	4–1	Inter - Santa Coloma	3–0	29 Apr.
18 Dec.	2–6	Peniscola - Magna Gurpea	4–4	29 Apr.
18 Dec.	4–1	Santiago - Jaén	5–5	29 Apr.
19 Dec.	1–1	Ribera Navarra - Palma	0–4	29 Apr.

=== Calendar ===
Round	Date	Fixtures	Clubs	Notes
Quarter-finals	13/14/20/21/22 May 2016	8	8 → 4	
Semifinals	27/28 May, 2/5 June 2016	4	4 → 2	
Final	9/11/16/18 June 2016	3	2 → 1	

=== Bracket ===
Quarter-finals
1	Movistar Inter	3	8
8	Peñíscola RehabMedic	2	4
4	Palma Futsal	2	4	2
5	Aspil Vidal R.N.	3	1	1
2	FC Barcelona Lassa	2	6
7	Catgas Energia S.C.	1	1
3	ElPozo Murcia	3	7	3
6	Magna Gurpea	4	3	4

Semifinals
1	Movistar Inter	2	2 ^{(3)}	5
4	Palma Futsal	3	2 ^{(2)}	3
2	FC Barcelona Lassa	3	3
6	Magna Gurpea	0	1

Final
1	Movistar Inter	6	5	4	3
2	FC Barcelona Lassa	2	3	6	1

=== Quarter-finals ===
==== 1st match ====
May 13, 2016	Magna Gurpea	4–3	ElPozo Murcia	Pamplona
20:30 (UTC+2)	Martil 16'; Araça 29'; Saldise 31'; Rafa Usín 39'	Boxscore	J Ruiz 1'; Lima 22', 32'	Stadium: Pabellón Anaitasuna; Attendance: 2,300; Referee: Gutiérrez Lumbreras, Lope Díaz

May 14, 2016	Peñíscola RehabMedic	2–3	Movistar Inter	Peñíscola
18:00 (UTC+2)	Carlinhos 11'; Asensio 28'	Boxscore	Cardinal 16'; Borja 17'; Daniel 33'	Stadium: Pabellón Municipal; Attendance: 1,000; Referee: Redondo Arenales, Viedma Martín

May 14, 2016	Aspil Vidal R.N.	3–2	Palma Futsal	Tudela
18:30 (UTC+2)	Pazos 7'; Roger 7'; Joselito 18'	Boxscore	Vadillo 36'; Sergio 39'	Stadium: Ciudad de Tudela; Referee: García Donas, Moreno Millán

May 14, 2016	Catgas Energia S.C.	1–2	FC Barcelona Lassa	Santa Coloma de Gramenet
20:00 (UTC+2)	Corvo 26'	Boxscore	Sergio Lozano 7', 38'	Stadium: Pavelló Nou; Attendance: 2,400; Referee: Peña Diaz, Peña Gomez

==== 2nd match ====
May 20, 2016	FC Barcelona Lassa	6–1	Catgas Energia S.C.	Barcelona
20:00 (UTC+2)	Dyego 18'; Gabriel 28'; Ferrão 29'; Wilde 36'; Aicardo 39', 39'	Boxscore	Adolfo 19'	Stadium: Palau Blaugrana; Referee: Juan Cerdá, Martínez García

May 20, 2016	ElPozo Murcia	7–3	Magna Gurpea	Murcia
20:30 (UTC+2)	Matteus 2'; Bebe 6'; Lima 10', 30'; Álex 12', 24'; Marinović 34'	Boxscore	Rafa Usín 16', 16'; Víctor 38'	Stadium: Palacio de Deportes; Referee: Moreno Reina, Ramos Marín

May 20, 2016	Palma Futsal	4–1	Aspil Vidal R.N.	Palma de Mallorca
20:30 (UTC+2)	Tomaz 11'; João Batista 19'; Paradynski 33'; Chico 40'	Boxscore	D Pazos 33'	Stadium: Palau d'Esports Son Moix; Referee: Martínez Segovia, Múnez Carpintero

May 20, 2016	Movistar Inter	8–4	Peñíscola RehabMedic	Torrejón de Ardoz
21:00 (UTC+2)	Humberto 15'; Cardinal 28', 34'; Daniel 28'; Ortiz 32'; Rivillos 33', 38'; Borja 35'	Boxscore	Míchel 1', 21'; Asensio 25'; Martel 40'	Stadium: Jorge Garbajosa; Referee: Cordero Gallardo, Linares López

==== 3rd match ====
May 22, 2016	ElPozo Murcia	3–4	Magna Gurpea	Murcia
12:00 (UTC+2)	Adri 1'; Víctor 23' (o.g.); Jê 29'	Boxscore	Araça 2'; Rafa Usín 3', 18'; Saldise 40'	Stadium: Palacio de Deportes; Referee: Bernabéu Haro, Rabadán Sáinz

May 22, 2016	Palma Futsal	2–1	Aspil Vidal R.N.	Palma de Mallorca
12:00 (UTC+2)	Sergio 15'; Bruno Taffy 34'	Boxscore	Joselito 35'	Stadium: Palau d'Esports Son Moix; Referee: Rodrigo Miguel, Sánchez Molina

=== Semifinals ===
==== 1st match ====
May 27, 2016	Movistar Inter	2–3	Palma Futsal	Torrejón de Ardoz
21:00 (UTC+2)	Borja 21'; Rivillos 28'	Boxscore	João Batista 24'; Paradynski 27'; Bruno Taffy 35'	Stadium: Jorge Garbajosa; Referee: Alonso Montesinos, Urdánoz Apezteguía

May 28, 2016	FC Barcelona Lassa	3–0	Magna Gurpea	Barcelona
18:00 (UTC+2)	Dyego 9'; Aicardo 12'; Sergio Lozano 39'	Boxscore		Stadium: Palau Blaugrana; Referee: Cuesta Sánchez, García Morón

==== 2nd match ====
June 2, 2016	Palma Futsal	2–2 (a.e.t.) (2–3 p)	Movistar Inter	Palma de Mallorca
21:00 (UTC+2)	Bruno Taffy 3', 30'	Boxscore	Rafael 6'; Daniel 14'	Stadium: Palau d'Esports Son Moix; Referee: García Donas, Moreno Millán
	Penalties
	Vadillo (penalty missed); Pizarro (penalty scored); Bruno Taffy (penalty scored)		Rivillos (penalty scored); Daniel (penalty scored); Cardinal (penalty scored)

June 2, 2016	Magna Gurpea	1–3	FC Barcelona Lassa	Pamplona
21:00 (UTC+2)	Rafa Usín 39'	Boxscore	Ferrão 15'; Aicardo 31'; Wilde 40'	Stadium: Pabellón Anaitasuna; Referee: Gutiérrez Lumbreras, Lope Díaz

==== 3rd match ====
June 5, 2016	Movistar Inter	5–3	Palma Futsal	Torrejón de Ardoz
20:30 (UTC+2)	Ricardinho 14', 38'; Barrón 14' (o.g.); Joao Batista 24' (o.g.); Rivillos 40'	Boxscore	Bruno Taffy 4'; Attos 4'; Pizarro 40'	Stadium: Jorge Garbajosa; Referee: Bernabéu Haro, Rabadán Sáinz

=== Final ===
==== 1st match ====
June 9, 2016	Movistar Inter	6–2	FC Barcelona Lassa	Torrejón de Ardoz
21:00 (UTC+2)	Borja 9'; Cardinal 24'; Pola 30'; Ricardinho 37', 38'; Rivillos 37'	Boxscore	Sergio Lozano 18'; Dyego 21'	Stadium: Jorge Garbajosa; Referee: Fortes Pardo, Martínez Flores

==== 2nd match ====
June 11, 2016	Movistar Inter	5–3	FC Barcelona Lassa	Torrejón de Ardoz
13:00 (UTC+2)	Borja 9'; Rivillos 32'; Ortiz 33'; Darlan 38'; Ricardinho 40'	Boxscore	Wilde 9'; Sergio Lozano 16', 20'	Stadium: Jorge Garbajosa; Referee: Cordero Gallardo, Linares López

==== 3rd match ====
June 16, 2016	FC Barcelona Lassa	6–4	Movistar Inter	Barcelona
21:00 (UTC+2)	Dyego 9', 27', 37'; Sergio Lozano 25', 31', 40'	Boxscore	Pola 9'; Cardinal 10'; Humberto 14', 29'	Stadium: Palau Blaugrana; Referee: Peña Díaz, Peña Gómez

==== 4th match ====
June 18, 2016	FC Barcelona Lassa	1–3	Movistar Inter	Barcelona
13:00 (UTC+2)	Ferrão 6'	Boxscore	Ricardinho 17'; Cardinal 29'; Ortiz 37'	Stadium: Palau Blaugrana; Referee: Alonso Montesinos, Urdánoz Apezteguía

2015–16 Primera División winners
(Community of Madrid)
Movistar Inter
Eleventh title

== Statistics ==
=== Top scorers ===
#	Player	Club	Goals
1	(Spain) Juan Carlos	Peñíscola RehabMedic	34
2	(Spain) Adolfo	Catgas Santa Coloma	31
3	(Brazil) Wilde	FC Barcelona Lassa	30
4	(Spain) Andresito	Aspil Vidal R.N.	29
5	(Spain) Quintela	Santiago Futsal	28
6	(Spain) Borja	Inter Movistar	26
6	(Brazil) Taffy	Palma	26
7	(Spain) Dani Salgado	Catgas Santa Colma	25
8	(Spain) Aicardo	FC Barcelona Lassa	23
8	(Spain) Tete	CD UMA Antequera	23
8	(Brazil) Bateria	FC Barcelona Lassa	23
8	(Spain) E. Martel	Peñíscola RehabMedic	23
9	(Spain) Eseverri	Magna Gurpea	22
9	(Spain) Rafa López	Catgas Santa Colma	22
9	(Spain) Miguelín	ElPozo Murcia FS	22

=== Hat-tricks ===
Player	For	Against	Result	Date
(Brazil) Bateria	FC Barcelona Lassa	Jumilla B. Carchelo	9–1	18 September 2015
(Spain) Tete	CD UMA Antequera	Jumilla B. Carchelo	4–5	25 September 2015
(Spain) Fabián	Catgas Santa Coloma	CD UMA Antequera	6–6	2 October 2015
(Portugal) Ricardinho	Inter Movistar	Magna Gurpea	6–5	3 October 2015
(Spain) Corvo	Catgas Santa Coloma	Aspil Vidal R.N.	5–2	9 October 2015
(Spain) Chino^{5}	Burela Pescados Rubén	Catgas Santa Coloma	8–5	23 October 2015
(Brazil) Humberto ^{4}	Inter Movistar	CD UMA Antequera	4–4	30 October 2015
(Spain) Juan Carlos ^{4}	Peñíscola RehabMedic	Elche CF	6–1	13 November 2015
(Spain) Adolfo	Catgas Santa Coloma	Jumilla B. Carchelo	6–4	13 November 2015
(Spain) Jesulito^{4}	Magna Gurpea	Catgas Santa Coloma	10–3	20 November 2015
(Spain) Catela	Santiago Futsal	Elche CF	10–1	20 November 2015
(Spain) Alex	ElPozo Murcia	Palma Futsal	5–3	24 November 2015
(Spain) Antonio Diz	Santiago Futsal	D-Link Zaragoza	5–5	25 November 2015
(Spain) Tete	CD UMA Antequera	Aspil Vidal R.N.	3–4	27 November 2015
(Spain) Márquez	Levante UD DM	Elche CF	7–3	28 November 2015
(Brazil) Taffy	Palma Futsal	CD UMA Antequera	5–1	4 December 2015
(Spain) Quintela	Santiago Futsal	Catgas Santa Coloma	6–5	4 December 2015
(Spain) Borja	Inter Movistar	Jumilla B. Carchelo	5–2	4 December 2015
(Brazil) Bateria	FC Barcelona Lassa	Elche CF	7–3	18 December 2015
(Spain) Jordi Lledó^{4}	Levante UD DM	Jumilla B. Carchelo	6–4	18 December 2015
(Spain) A. Vadillo	Palma Futsal	Magna Gurpea	5–4	22 December 2015
(Spain) Pitu	Elche CF	CD UMA Antequera	8–3	22 December 2015
(Spain) Andresito	Aspil Vidal R.N.	Elche CF	8–2	4 January 2016
(Spain) Rafa Usín	Magna Gurpea	Santiago Futsal	4–4	4 January 2016
(Brazil) Taffy	Palma	Elche CF	6–1	8 January 2016
(Spain) Borja	Inter Movistar	Santiago Futsal	11–1	9 January 2016
(Spain) Rafa López^{4}	Catgas Santa Coloma	CD UMA Antequera	6–6	15 January 2016
(Brazil) Tomaz	Palma	D-Link Zaragoza	6–5	15 January 2016
(Spain) Quintela^{4}	Santiago Futsal	ElPozo Murcia	6–5	19 January 2016
(Spain) Sergio^{4}	Palma	Jumilla B. Carchelo	7–2	20 January 2016
(Spain) Rafa Usín	Magna Gurpea	Elche CF	7–2	20 January 2016
(Spain) Andresito^{5}	Aspil Vidal R.N.	Jaén Paraíso Interior	8–3	20 February 2016
(Spain) Marc Tolrà	FC Barcelona Lassa	Santiago	7–4	20 February 2016
(Spain) Cecilio Morales Barbado	CD UMA Antequera	Santiago	11–3	26 February 2016
(Spain) Jordi Lledó	Levante UD DM	ElPozo Murcia	3–8	26 February 2016
(Spain) Adolfo^{4}	Catgas Santa Coloma	Burela Pescados Rubén	6–1	26 February 2016
(Spain) Carlitos	Magna Gurpea	D-Link Zaragoza	4–1	28 February 2016
(Spain) R. Orzáez	Jumilla B. Carchelo	D-Link Zaragoza	6–7	4 March 2016
(Spain) Borja	Inter Movistar	CD UMA Antequera	7–1	5 March 2016
(Spain) R.Orzáez	Jumilla B. Carchelo	Catgas Santa Coloma	4–5	24 March 2016
(Spain) Miguelín	ElPozo Murcia	CD UMA Antequera	6–0	26 March 2016
(Spain) Rivillos	Inter Movistar	Jumilla B. Carchelo	11–1	29 March 2016
(Brazil) Taffy	Palma	Levante UD DM	3–2	1 April 2016
(Spain) Juan Carlos	Peñíscola RehabMedic	D-Link Zaragoza	6–2	1 April 2016
(Spain) Carlitos	Magna Gurpea	CD UMA Antequera	6–4	8 April 2016
(Brazil) Matteus	ElPozo Murcia	Burela Pescados Rubén	8–1	16 April 2016
(Spain) Tete	CD UMA Antequera	Palma	5–3	22 April 2016
(Spain) José Ruiz	ElPozo Murcia	Elche CF	7–4	22 April 2016
(Spain) Lin	FC Barcelona Lassa	Elche CF	12–3	29 April 2016
(Brazil) Dyego	FC Barcelona Lassa	Elche CF	12–3	29 April 2016

Note

^{4} Player scored 4 goals
^{5} Player scored 5 goals

== See also ==
- 2015–16 Segunda División de Futsal
