= Garbajosa =

Garbajosa is a Spanish surname. Notable people with the surname include:

- Jorge Garbajosa (born 1977), Spanish basketball player
- Xavier Garbajosa (born 1976), French rugby player

== See also ==
- Pabellón Jorge Garbajosa, indoor arena
