= 2014–15 Primera División de Futsal =

Primera División
- Season: 2014–15
- Champions: Inter Movistar
- Relegated: Uruguay Tenerife & Prone Lugo
- UEFA Futsal Cup: Inter Movistar
- Matches played: 240
- Goals scored: 1,767 (7.36 per match)
- Top goalscorer: Dani Salgado (Marfil Santa Coloma) – 48 goals
- Biggest home win: Inter Movistar 16–1 Uruguay Tenerife
- Biggest away win: Uruguay Tenerife 0–11 Peñíscola Bodegas Dunviro
- Highest scoring: Montesinos Jumilla 7–12 Uruguay Tenerife

The 2014–15 season of the Primera División de Fútbol Sala was the 26th season of top-tier futsal in Spain. It was the fourth season under the "Primera División" name. The regular season started on September 12, 2014 and concluded on April 25, 2015. The championship playoffs followed the end of the regular season.

Inter Movistar were the defending champions, having defeated ElPozo Murcia 3–1 in the 2013–14 Championship Final series to win their ninth title overall and first since 2008.

Colegios Arenas G.C. finished in last place and so were relegated at the end of the 2013-2014 regular season. Levante UD DM were crowned 2013-2014 champions of Segunda División de Futsal and were promoted automatically. Uruguay Tenerife won the promotion playoffs 2-1 over Elche and were the other team to be promoted to the Primera División for the 2014-2015 season.

At the end of the regular season the top eight teams played in the championship playoffs.

== Teams ==
Location of teams in Primera División 2014–15
Canary Islands

Team	Location	Stadium	Capacity
Inter Movistar	Alcalá de Henares	Fundación Montemadrid	4,500
ElPozo Murcia	Murcia	Palacio de Deportes	7,500
FC Barcelona	Barcelona	Palau Blaugrana	7,500
Marfil Santa Coloma	Santa Coloma de Gramenet	Pavelló Nou	2,200
Magna Navarra	Pamplona	Pabellón Universitario	3,000
Montesinos Jumilla	Jumilla	Carlos García Ruiz	1,000
Burela Pescados Rubén	Burela	Vista Alegre	1,040
Aspil Vidal R.N.	Tudela	Ciudad de Tudela	1,200
Santiago Futsal	Santiago de Compostela	Fontes do Sar	6,000
Jaén Paraíso Interior	Jaén	La Salobreja	1,200
Palma Futsal	Palma de Mallorca	Son Moix	4,116
Peñíscola Bodegas Dunviro	Peñíscola	Pabellón Municipal	2,000
Prone Lugo	Lugo	Pabellón Municipal	2,300
D-Link Zaragoza	Zaragoza	Pabellón Siglo XXI	2,500
Levante UD DM	Valencia	El Cabanyal	1,000
Uruguay Tenerife	Santa Cruz de Tenerife	Palacio Municipal	4,500

== Regular season table ==
Pos	Team	Pld	W	D	L	GF	GA	GD	Pts	Qualification or relegation
1	Inter Movistar	30	25	4	1	152	60	+92	79	Qualification to the championship playoffs
2	FC Barcelona	30	24	2	4	149	67	+82	74	Qualification to the championship playoffs
3	ElPozo Murcia	30	23	4	3	152	71	+81	73	Qualification to the championship playoffs
4	Jaén Paraíso Interior	30	16	6	8	113	79	+34	54	Qualification to the championship playoffs
5	Palma Futsal	30	17	2	11	122	105	+17	53	Qualification to the championship playoffs
6	Magna Navarra	30	16	4	10	115	98	+17	52	Qualification to the championship playoffs
7	Aspil Vidal R.N.	30	15	6	9	101	91	+10	51	Qualification to the championship playoffs
8	Peñíscola Bodegas Dunviro	30	14	5	11	116	93	+23	47	Qualification to the championship playoffs
9	Burela Pescados Rubén	30	11	4	15	97	100	−3	37	
10	DLink Zaragoza	30	10	6	14	105	119	−14	36	
11	Santiago Futsal	30	9	5	16	80	103	−23	32	
12	Marfil Santa Coloma	30	9	5	16	140	134	+6	32	
13	Montesinos Jumilla	30	8	4	18	119	135	−16	28	
14	Levante UD DM	30	7	5	18	75	124	−49	26	
15	Uruguay Tenerife	30	3	0	27	72	205	−133	9	Relegation to Segunda División
16	Prone Lugo	30	1	2	27	59	183	−124	5	Relegation to Segunda División

Updated to match(es) played on 25 April 2015. Source: LNFS – Primera División and lnfs.es
Rules for classification: 1) points; 2) head-to-head points; 3) head-to-head goal difference; 4) goal difference; 5) number of goals scored

== Championship playoffs ==
=== Calendar ===
Round	Date	Fixtures	Clubs	Notes
Quarter-finals	8/9/15/16/17 May 2015	8	8 → 4	
Semifinals	23/30 May, 3 June 2015	4	4 → 2	
Final	6/7/12/13/16 June 2015	3	2 → 1	

=== Bracket ===
Quarter-finals
1	Inter Movistar	7	6
8	Peñíscola Bod. Dunviro	3	3
4	Jaén Paraíso Interior	4	1
5	Palma Futsal	5	2
2	FC Barcelona	3	7	4
7	Aspil Vidal R.N.	4	2	3
3	ElPozo Murcia	5	5
6	Magna Navarra	2	3

Semifinals
1	Inter Movistar	6	7
5	Palma Futsal	2	5
2	FC Barcelona	5	1	5
3	ElPozo Murcia	2	2	7

Final
1	Inter Movistar	7	1	3	5
3	ElPozo Murcia	3	5	0	4

=== Quarter-finals ===
==== 1st match ====
May 8, 2015	Magna Navarra	2–5	ElPozo Murcia	Pamplona
20:30 (UTC+2)	Carlitos 1'; J Eseverri 37'	Report	Juampi 1'; Gréllo 20'; Bebe 23'; Álex 26', 34'	Stadium: Pabellón Anaitasuna; Referee: Rodrigo Miguel, Sánchez Molina

May 8, 2015	Palma Futsal	5–4	Jaén Paraíso Interior	Palma de Mallorca
20:30 (UTC+2)	Paradynski 14'; B Taffy 15', 19'; Tomaz 16'; David 39'	Report	D Martín 6', 38'; B Blanco 10'; Campoy 18'	Stadium: Son Moix; Referee: Martínez Segovia, Múnez Carpintero

May 9, 2015	Aspil Vidal R.N.	4–3	FC Barcelona	Tudela
13:00 (UTC+2)	Roger 24', 29'; Joselito 33'; Palmas 39'	Report	S Lozano 6'; Lin 13'; Ferrão 22'	Stadium: Ciudad de Tudela; Referee: González Ruano, Rabadán Sáinz

May 9, 2015	Peñíscola Bodegas Dunviro	3–7	Inter Movistar	Peñíscola
18:00 (UTC+2)	Asensio 16'; Javi Alonso 33'; Juanqui 38'		Borja 3', 19'; Daniel 11'; Ricardinho 22'; C Ortiz 24'; Rivillos 26'; Cardinal 36'	Stadium: Pabellón Municipal; Referee: Sanzol Goñi, Urdánoz Apezteguía

==== 2nd match ====
May 14, 2015	FC Barcelona	7–2	Aspil Vidal R.N.	Barcelona
21:00 (UTC+2)	Lin 10', 12', 39'; Wilde 20'; Bateria 31'; Dyego 35'; Gabriel 37'	Report	Joselito 23'; Roger 26'	Stadium: Palau Blaugrana; Referee: Fortes Pardo, Martínez Flores

May 15, 2015	ElPozo Murcia	5–3 (a.e.t.)	Magna Navarra	Murcia
21:00 (UTC+2)	Gréllo 3'; Bebe 7', 46'; Ique 11'; Álex 45'	Report	Jesulito 21'; Tolrà 25', 26'	Stadium: Palacio de Deportes; Referee: Peña Díaz, Peña Gómez

May 15, 2015	Jaén Paraíso Interior	1–2	Palma Futsal	Jaén
21:00 (UTC+2)	Campoy 11'	Report	David 32'; B Taffy 39'	Stadium: Pabellón La Salobreja; Referee: Gutiérrez Lumbreras, Lope Díaz

May 16, 2015	Inter Movistar	6–3	Peñíscola Bodegas Dunviro	Alcalá de Henares
18:00 (UTC+2)	Cardinal 31'; Pola 33'; Rafael 38'; Ricardinho 39'; Rivillos 40'; Borja 40'	Report	Yeray 35'; Juanqui 36', 40'	Stadium: Fundación Montemadrid; Referee: Díaz Rodríguez, García Hernández

==== 3rd match ====
May 16, 2015	FC Barcelona	4–3	Aspil Vidal R.N.	Barcelona
13:00 (UTC+2)	Bateria 4', 15'; Wilde 24'; Sergio Lozano 27'	Report	Joselito 14'; R Orzáez 16'; Palmas 35'	Stadium: Palau Blaugrana; Referee: Felipe Madorrán, Gereta Ramírez

=== Semifinals ===
==== 1st match ====
May 22, 2015	FC Barcelona	5–2	ElPozo Murcia	Barcelona
21:20 (UTC+2)	Lin 6'; Ferrão 10', 11', 30'; Sergio Lozano 25'	Report	Adri 3'; Miguelín 37'	Stadium: Palau Blaugrana; Referee: Moreno Reina, Ramos Marín

May 23, 2015	Inter Movistar	6–2	Palma Futsal	Alcalá de Henares
13:00 (UTC+2)	Rafael 30'; Ricardinho 35', 36'; C Ortiz 37'; Daniel 40'; Rivillos 40'	Report	Vadillo 2'; B Taffy 9'	Stadium: Fundación Montemadrid; Referee: Cordero Gallardo, Linares López

==== 2nd match ====
May 30, 2015	ElPozo Murcia	2–1	FC Barcelona	Murcia
12:45 (UTC+2)	Álex 1'; Raúl Campos 19'	Report	Aicardo 21'	Stadium: Palacio de Deportes; Referee: Cuesta Sánchez, García Morón

May 31, 2015	Palma Futsal	5–7	Inter Movistar	Palma de Mallorca
12:00 (UTC+2)	Joselito 9'; B Taffy 11', 34'; João Batista 29'; Vadillo 39'	Report	Cardinal 5', 11'; Rafael 23', 24', 25'; Alex 32'; Pola 33'	Stadium: Son Moix; Referee: Rodrigo Miguel, Sánchez Molina

==== 3rd match ====
June 3, 2015	FC Barcelona	5–7	ElPozo Murcia	Barcelona
21:00 (UTC+2)	Wilde 20'; Aicardo 21'; Sergio Lozano 24', 29'; Ferrão 40'	Report	Álex 13', 36'; Gréllo 19'; José Ruiz 27', 28', 36'; Lima 38'	Stadium: Palau Blaugrana; Referee: Gutiérrez Lumbreras, Lope Díaz

=== Final ===
==== 1st match ====
June 6, 2015	Inter Movistar	7–3	ElPozo Murcia	Alcalá de Henares
13:00 (UTC+2)	Ricardinho 17', 19', 20', 38', 39'; Rafael 24'; Borja 28'		Raúl Campos 2'; Álex 28', 34'	Stadium: Fundación Montemadrid; Referee: Sanzol Goñi, Urdánoz Apezteguía

==== 2nd match ====
June 8, 2015	Inter Movistar	1–5	ElPozo Murcia	Alcalá de Henares
21:00 (UTC+2)	Rafael 32'	Report	Ique 9'; Raúl Campos 31', 39'; Matteus 34'; Adri 37'	Stadium: Fundación Montemadrid; Referee: Díaz Rodríguez, García Hernández

==== 3rd match ====
June 13, 2015	ElPozo Murcia	0–3	Inter Movistar	Murcia
13:00 (UTC+2)		Report	Ricardinho 18'; Rafael 31'; Daniel 34'	Stadium: Palacio de Deportes; Referee: Rodrigo Miguel, Sánchez Molina

==== 4th match ====
June 15, 2015	ElPozo Murcia	4–5	Inter Movistar	Murcia
21:00 (UTC+2)	Gréllo 6'; Lima 8'; Álex 14'; Bebe 19'	Report	Cardinal 15'; Ricardinho 19', 38', 39'; Pola 21'	Stadium: Palacio de Deportes; Referee: Peña Díaz, Peña Gómez

2014–15 Primera División winners
(Community of Madrid)
Inter Movistar
Tenth title

== Top scorers ==
Regular season only

#	Player	Club	Goals
1	(Spain) Dani Salgado	Marfil Santa Coloma	48
2	(Spain) Andresito	Aspil Vidal R.N.	30
3	(Spain) Raúl Campos	ElPozo Murcia	29
4	(Spain) Juanqui	Peñíscola Bodegas Dunviro	27
5	(Portugal) Cardinal	Inter Movistar	26
5	(Spain) Sergio Lozano	FC Barcelona	26
6	(Spain) Corvo	Uruguay Tenerife	25

== See also ==
- 2014–15 Segunda División de Futsal
