= 2012–13 Segunda División de Futsal =

Segunda División
- Season: 2012–13
- Promoted: Montesinos Jumilla, Castell Peñíscola Benicarló & Fuconsa Jaén
- Relegated: None
- Matches played: 182
- Goals scored: 1,344 (7.38 per match)
- Top goalscorer: Juan Pizarro (Playas de Castellón), 28 goals
- Biggest home win: Playas de Castellón 13–3 Uruguay Tenerife
- Biggest away win: Fuconsa Jaén 1–9 Uruguay Tenerife
- Highest scoring: Uruguay Tenerife 11–9 FS Cartagena

The 2012–13 Segunda División de Futsal season is the 20th season of second-tier futsal in Spain since its inception in 1993.

The season comprises regular season and championship playoff. Regular season started in October 2012 and finished on April 27, 2013. Top team at standings when finishing to play the regular season is promoted to Primera División while teams that finished between 2nd–6th positions play the promotion playoffs.

On 3 May, LNFS announced the cancellation of promotion playoffs due to Primera División's expansion to 16 teams, so Castell Peñíscola Benicarló and Fuconsa Jaén were promoted to Primera División.

== Teams ==
Location of Segunda División teams 2012–13
Canary Islands

Team	Location	Stadium	Capacity
Carnicer Torrejón	Torrejón de Ardoz, Community of Madrid	Jorge Garbajosa	4,500
Castell de Peñiscola	Peñíscola–Benicarló, Valencian Community	Pabellón de Benicarló	2,000
ElPozo Ciudad de Murcia	Murcia	Palacio de Deportes	7,500
Barcelona B Alusport	Barcelona	Pavelló Poliesportiu	472
Fuconsa Jaén	Jaén	La Salobreja	1,200
Andorra	Andorra la Vella,	Poliesportiu d'Andorra	1,784
Levante–Dominicos	Valencia	El Cabanyal	1,000
Melilla	Melilla	Javier Imbroda	3,800
Montesinos Jumilla	Jumilla, Region of Murcia	Carlos García Ruiz	2,000
Playas de Castellón	Castellón de la Plana	Ciutat de Castelló	6,000
Cartagena	Cartagena, Region of Murcia	Wsell de Guimbarda	2,500
UMA Antequera	Antequera, Andalusia	Fernando Argüelles	2,575
UPV Maristas Valencia	Valencia	Pavelló Poliesportiu	400
Uruguay–Tenerife	Santa Cruz de Tenerife	La Salud	500

== Regular season standings ==
	Team	Pld	W	D	L	GF	GA	Pts
1	Montesinos Jumilla	26	17	3	6	96	63	54
2	Castell Peñíscola Benicarló	26	17	3	6	115	74	54
3	Carnicer Torrejón	26	15	3	8	117	84	48
4	ElPozo Ciudad de Murcia	26	13	7	6	99	81	46
5	Fuconsa Jaén	26	14	3	9	93	69	45
6	FC Andorra	26	12	4	10	96	98	40
7	Playas de Castellón	26	13	2	11	114	99	39
8	FC Barcelona B Alusport	26	11	5	10	120	100	38
9	Levante Dominicos	26	9	8	9	79	80	35
10	Melilla	26	9	3	14	81	114	30
11	UMA Antequera	26	7	7	12	71	94	28
12	Cartagena	26	7	3	16	99	125	24
13	UPV Maristas Valencia	26	7	3	16	82	109	24
14	Uruguay Tenerife	26	4	0	22	82	154	12

- ElPozo Ciudad de Murcia is the ElPozo Murcia reserve team, so is ineligible to play in Primera División.
- Carnicer Torrejón carries a two-year ban from last season (2011–12) due to refusal to play in Primera División in 2012–13 season, making it ineligible to play the promotion playoff.

Promoted	Relegated

== Promotion playoffs ==
Promotion playoffs were cancelled.

== Top goal scorers ==
Player	Goals	Team
(Spain) Juan Pizarro	28	Playas de Castellón
(Spain) Solano	27	Fuconsa Jaén
(Brazil) Carlinhos	26	FC Andorra
(Brazil) Ique	25	FC Andorra
(Spain) Roger Serrano	25	FC Barcelona B Alusport
(Spain) Juandi	24	Montesinos Jumilla
(Spain) Yoni	24	Melilla
(Spain) Zamo	23	Carnicer Torrejón
(Spain) José Revert	22	ElPozo Ciudad de Murcia
(Spain) Juanillo	24	Playas de Castellón

== See also ==
- 2012–13 Primera División de Futsal
- 2012–13 Copa del Rey de Futsal
- Segunda División B de Futsal
