= Unión Tres Cantos FS =

Spanish futsal club

Unión Tres Cantos
- Full name: Unión Tres Cantos; Fútbol Sala
- Nickname(s): --
- Founded: 1991
- Ground: Pabellón Municipal, Tres Cantos; Spain
- Capacity: 2,000
- League: Preferente – FMFS
- 2011–12: Preferente – FMFS, –
Home colours	Away colours

Unión Tres Cantos Fútbol Sala is a futsal club based in Tres Cantos, city of the autonomous community of Community of Madrid.

The club was founded in 1991 and its pavilion is Pabellón Municipal with capacity of 2,000 seaters.

The club has the sponsorship of Tien 21 and Uicesa.

In May, 2008, after of gaining the promotion to División de Honor de Futsal, they were forced to relegate to Primera Nacional A due to economic limitations.

From 2008–09 season, the club only competes with youth and women's teams.

== Notable players ==
- (Spain) Rafael Usín
