= 2016–17 Primera División de Futsal =

Primera División
- Season: 2016–17
- Champions: Movistar Inter (12th)
- Relegated: Burela Pescados Rubén; Jumilla B. Carchelo
- UEFA Futsal Cup: Movistar Inter; FC Barcelona Lassa
- Matches: 260
- Goals: 1,731 (6.66 per match)
- Top goalscorer: Ferrão (Barcelona) – 37 goals
- Biggest home win: Jaén 14–0 Jumilla (Rd. 4)
- Biggest away win: Jumilla 3–11 FC Barcelona Lassa (Rd.3)
- Highest scoring: Movistar Inter 15–3 Jumilla (Rd.15)

The 2016–17 season of the Primera División de Fútbol Sala was the 28th season of top-tier futsal in Spain. It was the sixth season under the "Primera División" name. The regular season started on October 11, 2016, and ended on April 29, 2017. The championship playoffs followed the end of the regular season.

Movistar Inter defeated FC Barcelona Lassa 3 games to 2 in Championship Final series, winning its twelfth title overall and fourth in a row.

Elche V. Alberola and UMA Antequera finished in the last two places in the league and so were relegated at the end of the 2015-2016 regular season. ElPozo Ciudad de Murcia won the league, but are unable to be promoted because a club's "B" team cannot play in the top division. Plásticos Romero were promoted as highest ranking side from the Segunda División de Futsal. Gran Canaria won the promotion playoffs 2 games to 0 over Naturpellet Segovia and became the second team promoted to the Primera Division after a two-year absence from the top flight.

== Teams ==
Location of teams in Primera División 2015–16
Canary Islands

Team	Location	Stadium	Capacity
Movistar Inter	Torrejón de Ardoz	Jorge Garbajosa	2,900
ElPozo Murcia	Murcia	Palacio de Deportes	7,500
FC Barcelona Lassa	Barcelona	Palau Blaugrana	7,500
Catgas Energia S.C.	Santa Coloma de Gramenet	Pavelló Nou	2,200
Magna Gurpea	Pamplona	Polideportivo Anaitasuna	3,000
Jumilla B. Carchelo	Jumilla	Carlos García Ruiz	1,000
Burela Pescados Rubén	Burela	Vista Alegre	1,040
Aspil Vidal R.N.	Tudela	Ciudad de Tudela	1,200
Santiago Futsal	Santiago de Compostela	Fontes do Sar	6,000
Jaén Paraíso Interior	Jaén	La Salobreja	1,200
Palma Futsal	Palma de Mallorca	Son Moix	4,116
Peñíscola RehabMedic	Peñíscola	Pabellón Municipal	2,000
Gran Canaria	Las Palmas de Gran Canaria	Centro Insular	5,000
D-Link Zaragoza	Zaragoza	Pabellón Siglo XXI	2,500
Levante UD FS	Valencia	El Cabanyal	1,000
Plásticos Romero	Cartagena	Wsell de Guimbarda	2,500

== Regular season ==
=== Standings ===
Pos	Team	Pld	W	D	L	GF	GA	GD	Pts	Qualification or relegation
1	Movistar Inter	30	25	0	5	151	59	+92	75	Qualification to the championship playoffs
2	ElPozo Murcia	30	22	5	3	148	61	+87	71	Qualification to the championship playoffs
3	FC Barcelona Lassa	30	22	4	4	135	70	+65	70	Qualification to the championship playoffs
4	Jaén Paraíso Interior	30	16	5	9	103	72	+31	53	Qualification to the championship playoffs
5	Magna Gurpea	30	15	6	9	96	73	+23	51	Qualification to the championship playoffs
6	Palma Futsal	30	15	6	9	106	72	+34	51	Qualification to the championship playoffs
7	Peñíscola RehabMedic	30	14	6	10	105	94	+11	48	Qualification to the championship playoffs
8	Catgas Energia S.C.	30	11	7	12	106	104	+2	40	Qualification to the championship playoffs
9	Aspil Vidal R.N.	30	9	7	14	70	85	−15	34	
10	DLink Zaragoza	30	8	8	14	94	119	−25	32	
11	Santiago Futsal	30	8	7	15	89	118	−29	31	
12	Levante UD FS	30	7	9	14	82	110	−28	30	
13	Gran Canaria	30	8	6	16	85	130	−45	30	
14	Plásticos Romero Cartagena	30	6	8	16	80	115	−35	26	
15	Burela Pescados Rubén	30	8	1	21	88	132	−44	25	Relegation to Segunda División
16	Jumilla B. Carchelo	30	2	3	25	69	193	−124	9	Relegation to Segunda División

Source: LNFS – Primera División and lnfs.es

=== Results ===
Rd. 1		1st Match	Rd. 16
11 Oct.	0–1	Ribera Navarra - Levante	0–4	14 Jan.
11 Oct.	4–4	Zaragoza - ElPozo Murcia	0–9	14 Jan.
11 Oct.	3–2	Peníscola - FC Barcelona Lassa	1–6	14 Jan.
12 Oct.	0–5	Gran Canaria - Movistar Inter	2–6	14 Jan.
12 Oct.	3–4	Burela - Palma	2–5	14 Jan.
12 Oct.	4–3	Catgas Energía - Jaén	2–3	14 Jan.
12 Oct.	1–6	Jumilla - Santiago	3–5	14 Jan.
12 Oct.	1–1	Cartagena - Magna Gurpea	3–2	14 Jan.

Rd. 2		2nd Match	Rd. 17
14 Oct.	3–3	Levante - Zaragoza	2–6	21 Jan.
14 Oct.	4–1	Magna Gurpea - Jumilla	7–3	21 Jan.
14 Oct.	6–1	Palma - Ribera Navarra	3–2	21 Jan.
14 Oct.	2–5	ElPozo Murcia - Catgas Energía	7–6	21 Jan.
14 Oct.	5–4	FC Barcelona Lassa - Cartagena	3–1	21 Jan.
15 Oct.	7–1	Movistar Inter - Burela	4–0	21 Jan.
15 Oct.	5–4	Jaén - Peñíscola	1–3	21 Jan.
15 Oct.	4–3	Santiago - Gran Canaria	1–1	21 Jan.

Rd. 3		3rd Match	Rd. 18
21 Oct.	0–3	Cartagena - Jaén	2–5	4 Feb.
21 Oct.	6–5	Burela - Santiago	0–3	4 Feb.
21 Oct.	7–1	ElPozo Murcia - Levante	1–1	4 Feb.
22 Oct.	4–4	Catgas Energía - Peñíscola	0–7	4 Feb.
22 Oct.	4–4	Gran Canaria - Magna Gurpea	4–5	4 Feb.
22 Oct.	3–11	Jumilla - FC Barcelona Lassa	1–6	4 Feb.
22 Oct.	1–6	Ribera Navarra - Movistar Inter	1–3	4 Feb.
22 Oct.	1–7	Zaragoza - Palma	2–4	4 Feb.

Rd. 4		4th Match	Rd. 19
29 Oct.	4–2	FC Barcelona Lassa - Gran Canaria	6–6	11 Feb.
29 Oct.	14–0	Jaén - Jumilla	6–2	11 Feb.
29 Oct.	2–7	Levante - Catgas Energía	0–2	11 Feb.
29 Oct.	5–2	Magna Gurpea - Burela	5–0	11 Feb.
29 Oct.	5–2	Movistar Inter - Zaragoza	5–2	11 Feb.
29 Oct.	3–3	Palma - ElPozo Murcia	2–3	11 Feb.
29 Oct.	5–1	Peñíscola - Cartagena	7–3	11 Feb.
29 Oct.	2–4	Santiago - Ribera Navarra	2–5	11 Feb.

Rd. 5		5th Match	Rd. 20
4 Nov.	2–2	Ribera Navarra - Magna Gurpea	1–3	14 Feb.
4 Nov.	3–3	Catgas Energía - Cartagena	5–5	14 Feb.
4 Nov.	2–1	ElPozo Murcia - Movistar Inter	4–6	14 Feb.
4 Nov.	6–3	Gran Canaria – Jaén	0–5	14 Feb.
4 Nov.	1–5	Jumilla - Peñíscola	1–5	14 Feb.
4 Nov.	3–4	Levante - Palma	3–3	14 Feb.
4 Nov.	1–5	Burela - FC Barcelona Lassa	2–6	14 Feb.
4 Nov.	5–4	Zaragoza - Santiago	4–5	14 Feb.

Rd. 6		6th Match	Rd. 21
12 Nov.	7–1	FC Barcelona Lassa - Ribera Navarra	3–2	18 Feb.
12 Nov.	5–2	Jaén - Burela	4–2	18 Feb.
12 Nov.	5–2	Magna Gurpea - Zaragoza	3–3	18 Feb.
12 Nov.	9–1	Movistar Inter - Levante	4–1	18 Feb.
12 Nov.	4–1	Cartagena - Jumilla	3–3	18 Feb.
12 Nov.	7–4	Palma - Catgas Energía	2–1	18 Feb.
12 Nov.	6–3	Peñíscola - Gran Canaria	4–3	18 Feb.
12 Nov.	1–6	Santiago - ElPozo Murcia	2–6	18 Feb.

Rd. 7		7th Match	Rd. 22
19 Nov.	3–1	Ribera Navarra - Jaén	1–5	25 Feb.
19 Nov.	9–4	Catgas Energía - Jumilla	6–2	25 Feb.
19 Nov.	8–2	ElPozo Murcia - Magna Gurpea	2–1	25 Feb.
19 Nov.	3–2	Gran Canaria - Cartagena	2–7	25 Feb.
19 Nov.	2–2	Levante - Santiago	3–3	25 Feb.
19 Nov.	5–0	Palma - Movistar Inter	1–5	25 Feb.
19 Nov.	3–2	Burela - Peñíscola	1–5	25 Feb.
19 Nov.	3–3	Zaragoza - FC Barcelona Lassa	3–3	25 Feb.

Rd. 8		8th Match	Rd. 23
26 Nov.	2–3	FC Barcelona Lassa - ElPozo Murcia	2–1	4 Mar.
26 Nov.	3–1	Jaén - Zaragoza	4–4	4 Mar.
26 Nov.	2–2	Jumilla - Gran Canaria	5–5	4 Mar.
26 Nov.	5–1	Magna Gurpea - Levante	2–2	4 Mar.
26 Nov.	4–2	Movistar Inter - Catgas Energía	3–1	4 Mar.
26 Nov.	2–7	Cartagena - Burela	4–6	4 Mar.
26 Nov.	2–1	Peñíscola - Ribera Navarra	2–2	4 Mar.
26 Nov.	2–1	Santiago - Palma	3–8	4 Mar.

Rd. 9		9th Match	Rd. 24
3 Dec.	3–4	Ribera Navarra - Cartagena	2–2	18 Mar.
3 Dec.	5–3	Catgas Energía - Gran Canaria	5–3	18 Mar.
3 Dec.	3–3	ElPozo Murcia - Jaén	2–1	18 Mar.
3 Dec.	1–5	Levante - FC Barcelona Lassa	4–7	18 Mar.
3 Dec.	5–2	Movistar Inter - Santiago	9–3	18 Mar.
3 Dec.	2–5	Palma - Magna Gurpea	2–3	18 Mar.
3 Dec.	9–4	Burela - Jumilla	4–5	18 Mar.
3 Dec.	3–5	Zaragoza - Peñíscola	2–2	18 Mar.

Rd. 10		10th Match	Rd. 25
10 Dec.	5–1	FC Barcelona Lassa - Palma	1–1	4 Mar.
10 Dec.	4–2	Jaén - Levante	1–2	4 Mar.
10 Dec.	4–10	Gran Canaria - Burela	2–1	4 Mar.
10 Dec.	2–5	Jumilla - Ribera Navarra	0–5	4 Mar.
10 Dec.	1–4	Magna Gurpea - Movistar Inter	0–2	4 Mar.
10 Dec.	2–3	Cartagena - Zaragoza	2–6	4 Mar.
10 Dec.	1–4	Peñíscola - ElPozo Murcia	4–3	4 Mar.
10 Dec.	3–7	Santiago - Catgas Energía	3–3	4 Mar.

Rd. 11		11th Match	Rd. 26
17 Dec.	4–0	Ribera Navarra - Gran Canaria	3–3	29 Mar.
17 Dec.	2–1	Catgas Energía - Burela	3–5	29 Mar.
17 Dec.	4–4	ElPozo Murcia - Cartagena	4–3	29 Mar.
17 Dec.	3–3	Levante - Peñíscola	6–6	29 Mar.
17 Dec.	3–4	Movistar Inter - FC Barcelona Lassa	3–6	29 Mar.
17 Dec.	0–0	Palma - Jaén	1–1	29 Mar.
17 Dec.	4–3	Santiago - Magna Gurpea	1–5	29 Mar.
17 Dec.	6–2	Zaragoza - Jumilla	6–4	29 Mar.

Rd. 12		12th Match	Rd. 27
21 Dec.	7–1	FC Barcelona Lassa - Santiago	3–2	1 Apr.
21 Dec.	0–3	Jaén - Movistar Inter	7–4	1 Apr.
21 Dec.	5–3	Gran Canaria - Zaragoza	6–3	1 Apr.
21 Dec.	1–8	Jumilla - ElPozo Murcia	0–11	1 Apr.
21 Dec.	4–2	Magna Gurpea - Catgas Energía	2-2	1 Apr.
21 Dec.	5–2	Cartagena - Levante	4–5	1 Apr.
21 Dec.	3–1	Peñíscola - Palma	1–6	1 Apr.
21 Dec.	0–5	Burela - Ribera Navarra	3–6	1 Apr.

Rd. 13		13th Match	Rd. 28
30 Dec.	1–1	Catgas Energía - Ribera Navarra	2–2	15 Apr.
30 Dec.	1–3	Magna Gurpea - FC Barcelona Lassa	6–1	15 Apr.
30 Dec.	8–0	ElPozo Murcia - Gran Canaria	5–2	15 Apr.
30 Dec.	1–2	Levante - Jumilla	5–4	15 Apr.
30 Dec.	5–2	Movistar Inter - Peñíscola	8–2	15 Apr.
30 Dec.	8–0	Palma - Cartagena	3–3	15 Apr.
30 Dec.	3–3	Santiago - Jaén	2–3	15 Apr.
30 Dec.	5–4	Zaragoza - Burela	0–5	15 Apr.

Rd. 14		14th Match	Rd. 29
1 Jan.	4–2	Ribera Navarra - Zaragoza	2–2	22 Apr.
1 Jan.	3–4	Catgas Energía - FC Barcelona Lassa	3–7	22 Apr.
1 Jan.	5–3	Gran Canaria - Levante	1–8	22 Apr.
1 Jan.	3–5	Jumilla - Palma	4–8	22 Apr.
1 Jan.	4–3	Jaén - Magna Gurpea	2–3	22 Apr.
1 Jan.	1–5	Cartagena - Movistar Inter	0–5	22 Apr.
1 Jan.	7–7	Peñíscola - Santiago	0–4	22 Apr.
1 Jan.	2–8	Burela - ElPozo Murcia	1–7	22 Apr.

Rd. 15		15th Match	Rd. 30
10 Jan.	3–1	ElPozo Murcia - Ribera Navarra	9–0	29 Apr.
10 Jan.	3–1	Magna Gurpea - Peñíscola	1–4	29 Apr.
10 Jan.	5–0	FC Barcelona Lassa - Jaén	3–4	29 Apr.
10 Jan.	6–1	Levante - Burela	4–4	29 Apr.
10 Jan.	15–3	Movistar Inter - Jumilla	7–2	29 Apr.
10 Jan.	2–3	Palma - Gran Canaria	1–2	29 Apr.
10 Jan.	2–3	Santiago - Cartagena	2–2	29 Apr.
10 Jan.	6–2	Zaragoza - Catgas Energía	2–5	29 Apr.

== Championship Playoffs ==
=== Bracket ===
Quarter-finals
1	Movistar Inter	1 (1 p)	7	4
8	Catgas Energia	1*(3 p)	0	2
4	Jaén Paraíso Interior	2	6*(3 p)	3
5	Magna Gurpea	3	66 (1 p)	5
2	ElPozo Murcia	4	9
7	Peñíscola RehabMedic	1	0
3	FC Barcelona Lassa	5	5
6	Palma Futsal	2	1

Semifinals
1	Movistar Inter	*7	4
5	Magna Gurpea	3	0
2	ElPozo Murcia	3	1	2 (1p)
3	FC Barcelona Lassa	2	5	2*(3p)

Final
1	Movistar Inter	2 (1p)	6	1	6	2
3	FC Barcelona Lassa	2*(3p)	1	6	1	1

== See also ==
- 2016–17 Segunda División de Futsal
