= Mario Rivillos =

Spanish futsal player

Personal information
- Full name: Mario Rivillos Plaza
- Date of birth: 13 December 1989 (age 36)
- Place of birth: Torrejón de Ardoz, Madrid, Spain
- Position: Ala

Team information
- Current team: Palma Futsal
- Number: 10

Youth career
- 2002–2004: Carnicer Torrejón
- 2004–2005: Arganda
- 2005–2007: Sport Sala
- 2007–2008: UD Las Rozas Boadilla

Senior career*
Years	Team	Apps	(Gls)
2008–2012	Carnicer Torrejón	108	(64)
2012–2017	Inter Movistar	136	(73)
2017–2020	Barcelona	50	(23)
2020–2022	Levante UD	60	(21)
2022–	Palma Futsal	79	(26)

International career
- Spain
Medal record
Men's futsal
Representing Spain
UEFA Futsal Championship
Winner	2026 Latvia / Lithuania / Slovenia
- * Club domestic league appearances and goals as of 22 May 2025

Mario Rivillos Plaza (born 13 December 1989), commonly known as Rivillos, is a Spanish futsal player who plays for Levante UD FS as an Ala.

== Honours ==
Inter Movistar

- 4 Primera División: 2013–14, 2014–15, 2015–16, 2016–17,
- 3 Copa de España: 2014, 2016, 2017
- 1 Copa de S.M. El Rey: 2015
- 2 Supercopa de España de Futsal: 2015, 2017; Runner-up: 2014
- 1 UEFA Futsal Cup: 2016–17

FC Barcelona

- 1 Primera División: 2018–19
- 2 Copa de España: 2019, 2020
- 2 Copa de S.M. El Rey: 2018, 2019
- 1 Supercopa de España de Futsal: 2019

Palma Futsal

- 3 UEFA Futsal Champions League:

Spain

- 1 UEFA Futsal Championship: UEFA Futsal Euro 2016
