= Rafa Usín =

Spanish futsal player

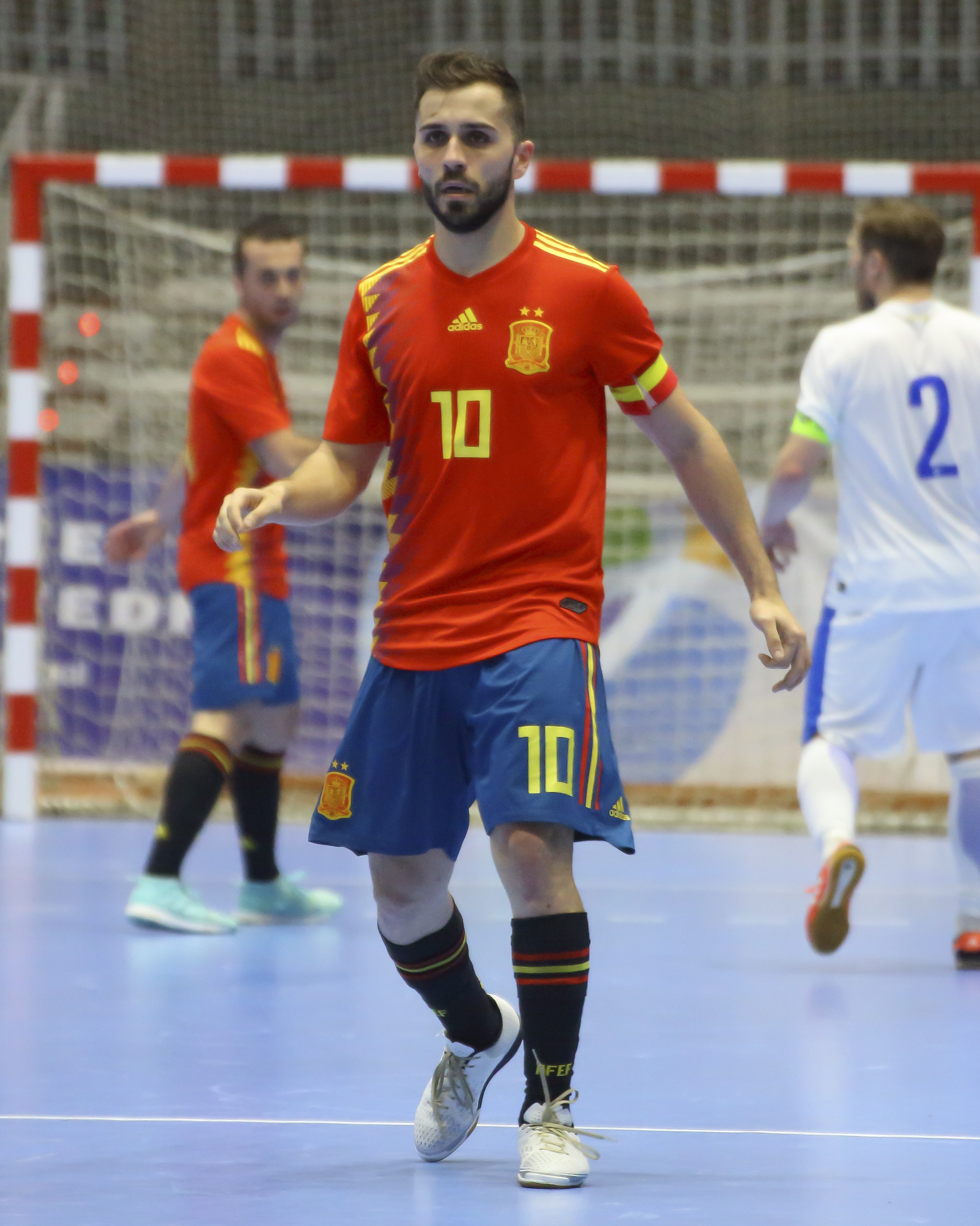

Personal information
- Full name: Rafael Usín Guisado
- Date of birth: 22 May 1987 (age 39)
- Place of birth: Madrid, Spain
- Position: Pivot

Team information
- Current team: FC Barcelona Futsal

Youth career
- 1994–2002: Corazonistas
- 2002–2003: Carnicer Autoexpert
- 2003–2004: Boomerang Interviú

Senior career*
Years	Team	Apps	(Gls)
2004–2006	Tres Cantos	27	(7)
2006–2007	Mifesa Timón	12	(4)
2006–2007	MRA Navarra	1	(1)
2007–2008	MRA Área 99	32	(12)
2008–	Triman Navarra	142	(61)
2014–2015	FC Barcelona Futsal		

International career
- Spain
- * Club domestic league appearances and goals

Rafael Usín Guisado (born 22 May 1987), commonly known as Rafa Usín, is a Spanish futsal player who plays for FC Barcelona Futsal as a Pivot.
