= CompoSala Futsal =

Spanish futsal club

CompoSala
- Full name: CompoSala Futsal Club
- Founded: 1975
- Ground: Multiusos Fontes do Sar, Santiago de Compostela, Galicia, Spain
- Capacity: 6,666
- Chairman: Ramón García Seara
- Manager: Santi Valladares
- League: Primera División
- 2015–16: Primera División, 10th
Home colours	Away colours

CompoSala Futsal, formerly known as Santiago Futsal and Autos Lobelle de Santiago Fútbol Sala, is a professional futsal club based in Santiago de Compostela, Galicia.

The club was founded in 1975 and plays its home games at the Multiusos Fontes do Sar with a capacity of 6,666 seats.

== History ==
Former logo

The club was founded in 1975 by José Antonio Lobelle, owner of car company Autos Lobelle and former club's chairman. In its early years, players were taken from the ranks of the company's employees.

Before the 2012–13 season, the club changed its name to Santiago Futsal, modifying also its logo.

Before the 2023–24 season, the club changed its name to CompoSala Futsal, modifying also its logo.

== Sponsors ==
- Autos Lobelle (1975–2009)
- Xacobeo 2010 (2009–2011)
- Autos Lobelle (2011–2012)

== Season to season ==
Season	Tier	Division	Place	Notes
1993/94	3	1ª Nacional A	-	
1994/95	3	1ª Nacional A	-	
1995/96	3	1ª Nacional A	-	
1996/97	3	1ª Nacional A	-	
1997/98	3	1ª Nacional A	-	
1998/99	3	1ª Nacional A	-	
1999/00	3	1ª Nacional A	-	↑
2000/01	2	D. Plata	7th	
2001/02	2	D. Plata	8th	
2002/03	2	D. Plata	2nd	↑
2003/04	1	D. Honor	10th	
2004/05	1	D. Honor	7th	

Season	Tier	Division	Place	Notes
2005/06	1	D. Honor	5th	
2006/07	1	D. Honor	11th	
2007/08	1	D. Honor	7th	
2008/09	1	D. Honor	4th	
2009/10	1	D. Honor	4th	
2010/11	1	D. Honor	4th	
2011/12	1	1ª División	5th / QF	
2012/13	1	1ª División	7th / QF	
2013/14	1	1ª División	9th	
2014/15	1	1ª División	11th	
2015/16	1	1ª División	10th	
2016/17	1	1ª División	11th	

- 15 seasons in Primera División
- 3 seasons in Segunda División
- 8 seasons in Segunda División B

== Current squad ==
As of 18 September 2026

== Trophies ==
- European Futsal Winners Cup: 1
  - Winners: 2007
- Copa de España: 1
  - Winners: 2006
- Supercopa de España: 1
  - Winners: 2010

== Notable players ==
- (Brazil) Betão
