= Ribera Navarra FS =

Spanish futsal club

Aspil Vidal R.N.
- Full name: Ribera Navarra Fútbol Sala
- Nickname(s): --
- Founded: 2001
- Ground: Ciudad de Tudela
- Capacity: 1,200
- President: (Spain) Alberto Ramírez Arregui
- Coach: (Spain) Álvaro Cordón
- League: Primera División
- 2022–23: Regular season: 11th of 16; Playoffs: DNQ
- Website: http://www.riberanavarrafs.com/
Home colours	Away colours

Ribera Navarra Fútbol Sala is a futsal club based in Tudela, a city in the autonomous community of Navarre, Spain. It was founded in 2001 and its pavilion is Ciudad de Tudela with a capacity of 1,200.

== Sponsors ==
- OPDE - (2009–2010)
- Ríos Renovables - (2010–2014)
- Aspil - (2014–present)

== Squad ==
As of 11 November 2024

Note: Flags indicate national team as defined under FIFA eligibility rules; some limited exceptions apply. Players may hold more than one non-FIFA nationality.

No.	Pos.	Nation	Player
2	Defender	(Spain) ESP	David García (captain)
4	Defender	(Spain) ESP	Adrián Tapias
6	Winger	(Brazil) BRA	João Batista
7	Pivot	(Brazil) BRA	Guilherme
8	Winger	(Argentina) ARG	Lucas Tripodi
10	Defender	(Spain) ESP	Sepe
11	Winger	(Spain) ESP	Alberto Lahuerta
13	Goalkeeper	(Spain) ESP	Adrián Pereira
14	Defender	(Spain) ESP	Daniel Fernández
15	Goalkeeper	(Spain) ESP	Raúl Jiménez
17	Winger	(Albania) ALB	Darrieer Melo
18	Winger	(Brazil) BRA	Gabriel Vasques
22	Winger	(Spain) ESP	Marc Campàs
23	Pivot	(Spain) ESP	Eric Pérez
36	Goalkeeper	(Spain) ESP	Gabriel Mena
77	Pivot	(Spain) ESP	Joselito

== Season to season ==
Season	Tier	Division	Place	Notes
2001/02	4	1ª Nacional B	—	
2002/03	4	1ª Nacional B	—	
2003/04	4	1ª Nacional B	—	
2004/05	3	1ª Nacional A	—	
2005/06	4	1ª Nacional B	—	
2006/07	4	1ª Nacional B	—	
2007/08	3	1ª Nacional A	10th	
2008/09	3	1ª Nacional A	2nd	
2009/10	2	D. Plata	13th	
2010/11	2	D. Plata	2nd	

Season	Tier	Division	Place	Notes
2011/12	1	1ª División	12th	
2012/13	1	1ª División	8th / QF	
2013/14	1	1ª División	8th / QF	
2014/15	1	1ª División	7th / QF	
2015/16	1	1ª División	5th / QF	
2016/17	1	1ª División	9th	
2017/18	1	1ª División	8th / QF	
2018/19	1	1ª División	7th / QF	
2019/20	1	1ª División	13th	
2020/21	1	1ª División	11th	

Season	Tier	Division	Place	Notes
2021/22	1	1ª División	6th / QF	

- 11 seasons in Primera División
- 2 seasons in Segunda División
- 3 seasons in Segunda División B
- 5 seasons in Tercera División
