= CFS Jumilla =

Spanish futsal club

Jumilla Bodegas Carchelo
- Full name: Club de Fútbol Sala Jumilla
- Nickname(s): --
- Founded: 1997
- Ground: Carlos García Ruiz, Jumilla, Region of Murcia; Spain
- Capacity: 1,000
- Chairman: (Spain) Jorge Pastor
- Manager: (Spain) Juan Francisco Gea
- League: Primera División
- 2015–16: Primera División, 14th
| Home colours | Away colours |

Club de Fútbol Sala Jumilla is a futsal club based in Jumilla, city of the autonomous community of Region of Murcia.

The club was established in 1997 and play home matches at Pabellón Carlos García Ruiz with capacity of 1,000 seaters.

== History ==
The team played in regional divisions until 2004 when was promoted to División de Plata, achieving the promotion to Primera División in 2013.

== Sponsors ==
- Tapizados Roster - (1997–2008)
- Central Quesera Montesinos - (2008–)

== Season to season ==
| Season | Tier | Division | Place | Notes |
|---|---|---|---|---|
| 1997/98 | 6 | 2ª Regional | 1st | ↑ |
| 1998/99 | 5 | 1ª Territorial | 1st | ↑ |
| 1999/00 | 4 | 1ª Nacional B | 1st | |
| 2000/01 | 4 | 1ª Nacional B | 1st | ↑ |
| 2001/02 | 3 | 1ª Nacional A | — | |
| 2002/03 | 3 | 1ª Nacional A | 3rd | |
| 2003/04 | 3 | 1ª Nacional A | 1st | ↑ |
| 2004/05 | 2 | D. Plata | 8th | |
| 2005/06 | 2 | D. Plata | 5th | |
| 2006/07 | 2 | D. Plata | 5th | |

| Season | Tier | Division | Place | Notes |
|---|---|---|---|---|
| 2007/08 | 2 | D. Plata | 15th | |
| 2008/09 | 2 | D. Plata | 11th | |
| 2009/10 | 2 | D. Plata | 6th | ↓ |
| 2010/11 | 3 | 1ª Nacional A | 1st | |
| 2011/12 | 3 | 1ª Nacional A | 1st | ↑ |
| 2012/13 | 2 | 2ª División | 1st | ↑ |
| 2013/14 | 1 | 1ª División | 6th / QF | |
| 2014/15 | 1 | 1ª División | 13th | |
| 2015/16 | 1 | 1ª División | 14th | |
| 2016/17 | 1 | 1ª División | — | |

- 4 seasons in Primera División
- 7 seasons in Segunda División
- 5 seasons in Segunda División B
- 2 seasons in Tercera División

== Current squad 2013/14 ==
| No. | Player | Full name | Pos. | Nat. |
| 1 | Loren | Lorenzo Martínez Bernal | Goalkeeper | (Spain) |
| 15 | Yeray | Yeray Olivero | Goalkeeper | (Spain) |
| 21 | Chico | Roberto Fernández Valls | Goalkeeper | (Spain) |
| 2 | Boyis | Antonio Manuel Sánchez | Cierre | (Spain) |
| 8 | Cristian | Cristian Jiménez López | Cierre | (Spain) |
| 17 | Rober | Roberto Rivas Hernández | Cierre | (Spain) |
| 4 | Ángel | Ángel de la Rosa | Ala | (Spain) |
| 5 | Baca | David Vicente Baca | Ala | (Spain) |
| 6 | Lolo Suazo | Manuel María Suazo | Ala | (Spain) |
| 12 | Josiko | José Antonio García González | Ala | (Spain) |
| 14 | Pichi | Alberto Yáñez | Ala | (Spain) |
| 9 | Ique | Carlos Henrique Ribeiro | Pivot | (Brazil) |
| 10 | Pizarro | Juan Pizarro Herranz | Pivot | (Spain) |
| 11 | Rubén Zamora | Rubén Zamora Jiménez | Pivot | (Spain) |
| 13 | Chino | Javier García Moreno | Pivot | (Spain) |
