= CD Burela FS =

Spanish futsal club

Burela Pescados Rubén
- Full name: Club Deportivo Burela Fútbol Sala
- Nickname(s): --
- Founded: 2001
- Ground: Vista Alegre, Burela; Spain
- Capacity: 1,400
- Chairman: Manuel Blanco Fanego
- Coach: (Spain) David Rial
- League: Primera División
- 2023–24: Segunda División, 3rd of 16 (promoted)
- Website: https://burelafs.org/
Home colours	Away colours

Club Deportivo Burela Fútbol Sala is a futsal club based in Burela, province of Lugo, in the northwestern autonomous community of Galicia.

The club was founded in 2001 as a split-off of A Mariña FS. The club plays its home games in Pavillón Vista Alegre with capacity of 1,400 seaters.

== Sponsors ==
- Conservas de Burela - (2001–2002)
- Pescados Rubén - (2002–)

== Season to season ==
Season	Tier	Division	Place	Notes
2001/02	4	1ª Nacional B	2nd	↑
2002/03	3	1ª Nacional A	2nd	↑
2003/04	2	D. Plata	6th	
2004/05	2	D. Plata	2nd	
2005/96	2	D. Plata	3rd	
2006/07	2	D. Plata	4th	
2007/08	2	D. Plata	5th	
2008/09	2	D. Plata	3rd	
2009/10	2	D. Plata	2nd	
2010/11	2	D. Plata	5th	
2011/12	2	2ª División	9th	↑
2012/13	1	1ª División	12th	
2013/14	1	1ª División	7th / QF	
2014/15	1	1ª División	9th	
2015/16	1	1ª División	9th	
2016/17	1	1ª División	15th	↓
2017/18	2	2ª División	4th	
2018/19	2	2ª División	1st	↑
2019/20	1	1ª División		

- 6 seasons in Primera División
- 11 seasons in Segunda División
- 1 seasons in Segunda División B
- 1 seasons in Tercera División

== Current squad ==
As of 3 November 2024

Note: Flags indicate national team as defined under FIFA eligibility rules; some limited exceptions apply. Players may hold more than one non-FIFA nationality.

No.	Pos.	Nation	Player
2	Goalkeeper	(Brazil) BRA	Mika
4	Defender	(Chile) CHI	Bernardo Araya
5	Defender	(Spain) ESP	Jorge Quelle
6	Pivot	(Spain) ESP	Pitero
7	Winger	(Brazil) BRA	Rikelme Ribeira
9	Defender	(Spain) ESP	Isma (captain)
10	Winger	(Spain) ESP	Charly
13	Winger	(Brazil) BRA	Wagner Juninho
14	Winger	(Spain) ESP	Alberto Mirás
19	Goalkeeper	(Spain) ESP	Gabriel Díaz
24	Goalkeeper	(Poland) POL	Michał Kałuża
25	Winger	(Spain) ESP	David Gomes
27	Winger	(Spain) ESP	Bruno Expósito
88	Winger	(Brazil) BRA	Guilherme Meira
96	Pivot	(Spain) ESP	Malaguti

== Miscellaneous ==
- It is the only club with two teams in every professional league (men's and women's).
- Ronaldinho is an honorary member of CD Burela FS.
