= Carlos Ortiz (futsal player) =

Spanish futsal player

Personal information
- Full name: Carlos Ortiz Jiménez
- Date of birth: 3 October 1983 (age 43)
- Place of birth: Madrid, Spain
- Height: 1.81 m (5 ft 11 in)
- Position: Universal

Team information
- Current team: Moreland Futsal Club
- Number: 23

Senior career*
Years	Team	Apps	(Gls)
1998–1999	Carnicer		
1999–2001	Regal Sport		
2001–2003	Atlético Boadilla		
2003–2004	Algaraba Olías del Rey		
2004–2006	Las Rozas Boadilla	52	(30)
2006–2008	MRA Navarra	55	(14)
2008–2020	Inter Movistar	144	(23)
2020–2021	Asnieres Villeneuve		
2021–	Barcelona		

International career
	Spain	215	
- * Club domestic league appearances and goals

Carlos Ortiz Jiménez (born 3 October 1983), commonly known as Ortiz, is a Spanish futsal player who plays for FC Barcelona as a Defender. In 2020 he was awarded a spot in the 2020 FutsalFeed's Best Team of the Year Award.

== Honours ==
- UEFA Futsal Champions League
  - Champion: 2008–09
  - Fourth place: 2018–19
- FIFA Futsal World Cup
  - Runner-up: 2008
- UEFA Futsal Championship
  - Champion: 2007
- Supercopa de España de Futsal
  - Winner: 2009
- Copa de España de Futsal
  - Winner: 2009
- Revelation player of LNFS (06/07)
- Best Team of the Year: Defender (2020)
