= Fernando Cardinal =

Portuguese futsal player

Personal information
- Full name: Fernando Alberto dos Santos Cardinal
- Date of birth: 26 June 1985 (age 41)
- Place of birth: Porto, Portugal
- Height: 1.82 m (6 ft 0 in)
- Position: Pivot

Team information
- Current team: Sporting CP
- Number: 7

Youth career
- 1998–2001: Miramar
- 2001–2002: Cafetaria Ouro
- 2003: Mocidade da Arrábida
- 2003–2004: Miramar

Senior career*
Years	Team	Apps	(Gls)
2004–2005	Jorge Antunes		
2005–2006	Famalicense		
2006	Boavista		
2007	Alpendorada		
2007–2009	Freixieiro		
2009–2011	Sporting CP	72	(105)
2011–2012	CSKA Moskva		
2012–2013	Rio Ave		
2013–2016	Inter FS	108	(88)
2016–2017	ElPozo Murcia	23	(22)
2017–	Sporting CP	19	(18)

International career^{‡}
2008–	Portugal	120	(87)
- * Club domestic league appearances and goals as of 00:00, 11 August 2018 (UTC) ‡ National team caps and goals as of 00:00, 11 August 2018 (UTC)

Fernando Alberto dos Santos Cardinal (born 26 June 1985), is a Portuguese professional futsal player who plays for Sporting CP and the Portugal national team.

== Honours ==
- UEFA Futsal Champions League: 2018–19
