= Pabellón Jorge Garbajosa =

Indoor arena in Torrejón de Ardoz, Spain

- Interactive map of Pabellón Jorge Garbajosa
- Former names: Pabellón Parque Corredor (1996–2006)
- Address: Carretera Torrejón-Ajalvir, km 1,200, 28850 Torrejón de Ardoz, Madrid, Spain
- Location: Torrejón de Ardoz, Spain
- Coordinates: 40°28′42″N 3°28′41″W
- Owner: Torrejón de Ardoz Town Hall
- Capacity: 3,136
- Surface: Parquet Floor

Construction
- Opened: 1996

Tenants
- Carnicer Torrejón (1987–2014); Inter Movistar (1996–2004, 2015–present); Real Madrid (1998-1999)

Pabellón Jorge Garbajosa, formerly known as Pabellón Parque Corredor, is an indoor arena located in Torrejón de Ardoz, Community of Madrid, Spain. It is mainly used by Inter Movistar for its futsal games.

== History ==
Opened in 1996, in June 2006, the arena changed its name in homage of basketball player Jorge Garbajosa, born in Torrejón de Ardoz.

In July 2015, Inter FS decided to come back to Pabellón Jorge Garbajosa twelve years later since the futsal club left the arena for playing at Alcalá de Henares.
