= 2011–12 Primera División de Futsal =

Primera División
- Season: 2011–12
- Champions: Barcelona Alusport
- Relegated: Reale Cartagena, Carnicer Torrejón & OID Talavera
- Matches: 228
- Goals: 1,540 (6.75 per match)
- Top goalscorer: Esquerdinha (ElPozo Murcia) – 38 goals
- Biggest home win: Barcelona Alusport 13–2 OID Talavera
- Biggest away win: Reale Cartagena 2–11 Carnicer Torrejón
- Highest scoring: Fisiomedia Manacor 9–7 Azkar Lugo

The 2011–12 season of the Primera División de Fútbol Sala was the 23rd season of top-tier futsal in Spain. It is the first under "Primera División" name. The regular season started on September 9, 2011, and finished on May 11, 2012. The championship playoffs began on May 19 with quarter-finals series and ended with the final series from 12 to 24 June.

Barcelona Alusport won their 2nd title in a row by defeating ElPozo Murcia 3–2 in the Championship Final.

== Teams ==
=== Personnel and kits ===
Team	Location	Manager	Kit manufacturer	Shirt sponsor
ElPozo Murcia	Murcia	"Duda"	Luanvi	ElPozo
FC Barcelona Alusport	Barcelona	Marc Carmona	Nike	Alusport
Inter Movistar	Alcalá de Henares	Daniel Ibañes	Joma	Movistar
Caja Segovia	Segovia	Jesús Velasco	Uhlsport	Caja Segovia
A. Lobelle Santiago	Santiago de Compostela	Tomás de Dios	Macron	Cupa
Triman Navarra	Pamplona	Imanol Arregui	Lotto	Triman
Carnicer Torrejón	Torrejón de Ardoz	José Carnicer	Luanvi	Fiat Carnicer
Umacon Zaragoza	Zaragoza	Santi Herrero	Joma	Umacon
Puertollano	Puertollano	David Ramos	Joma	Ayuntamiento de Puertollano
Fisiomedia Manacor	Manacor	"Pato" Navarro	Umbro	Fisiomedia
OID Talavera	Talavera de la Reina	Carlos Sánchez	Joma	OID
Ríos Renovables R.N.	Tudela	Víctor Acosta	Joma	Ríos Renovables
Azkar Lugo	Lugo	Diego Ríos	Lotto	Azkar
Marfil Santa Coloma	Santa Coloma	Xavi Passarrius	Macron	Marfil Alella
Reale Cartagena	Cartagena	Javi Aparicio	Elements	Reale Seguros
~~Benicarló Aeroport Castelló~~	Benicarló	—	—	—

=== Stadia and locations ===
Location of teams in División de Honor 2011–12

Team	Location	Stadium	Capacity
ElPozo Murcia	Murcia	Palacio de Deportes de Murcia	7,500
Barcelona Alusport	Barcelona	Palau Blaugrana	7,500
Inter Movistar	Alcalá de Henares	Pabellón Caja Madrid	4,500
Caja Segovia	Segovia	Pabellón Pedro Delgado	2,800
A. Lobelle Santiago	Santiago de Compostela	Pabellón Multiusos Fontes do Sar	6,000
Triman Navarra	Pamplona	Pabellón Universitario de Navarra	3,000
Carnicer Torrejón	Torrejón de Ardoz	Pabellón Jorge Garbajosa	4,000
Umacon Zaragoza	Zaragoza	Pabellón Siglo XXI	2,500
Puertollano	Puertollano	Polideportivo Antonio Rivilla	2,000
Fisiomedia Manacor	Manacor	Palma Arena	5,000
OID Talavera	Talavera de la Reina	Primero de Mayo	3,000
Ríos Renovables R.N.	Tudela	Municipal Elola	1,000
Azkar Lugo	Lugo	Pabellón Municipal de Lugo	2,300
Marfil Santa Coloma	Santa Coloma de Gramenet	Jacint Verdaguer	2,500
Reale Cartagena	Cartagena	Pabellón Wsell de Guimbarda	2,500
Benicarló	Benicarló	Pabellón de Benicarló	2,000

== League table ==
	Team	Pld	W	D	L	GF	GA	Pts
1	ElPozo Murcia	30	25	4	1	153	69	79
2	Barcelona Alusport	30	23	5	2	149	65	74
3	Inter Movistar	30	20	4	6	123	61	64
4	Caja Segovia	30	15	4	11	98	81	49
5	Autos Lobelle	30	13	8	9	85	75	47
6	Triman Navarra	30	13	6	11	92	102	45
7	Carnicer Torrejón	30	13	6	11	103	97	45
8	Umacon Zaragoza	30	12	7	11	95	96	43
9	Puertollano	30	12	3	15	88	98	39
10	Fisiomedia Manacor	30	11	4	15	98	110	37
11	OID Talavera	30	10	6	14	83	112	36
12	Ríos Renovables R.N.	30	9	6	15	86	106	33
13	Azkar Lugo	30	9	2	19	95	125	29
14	Marfil Santa Coloma	30	8	4	18	71	106	28
15	Reale Cartagena	30	7	3	20	80	142	24
16	Benicarló	30	3	2	25	41	95	0

Benicarló withdrew at mid-season. Later, the club was disbanded. All its records achieved were expunged.

Source: Liga Nacional de Futbol Sala

Championship playoffs
Relegation playoff
Relegation to Segunda División

== Championship playoffs ==
quarter-finals
1	ElPozo Murcia	3	10	7
8	Unacon Zaragoza	5	2	3
4	Caja Segovia	3 (3)	4
5	A. Lobelle	3 (1)	2
3	Inter Movistar	4 (4)	7
6	Triman Navarra	4 (3)	2
2	Barcelona Alusport	2	5
7	Carnicer Torrejón	1	2

semifinals
1	ElPozo Murcia	4	4	4
4	Caja Segovia	6	3	1
3	Inter Movistar	4	4
2	Barcelona Alusport	5	7

final
1	ElPozo Murcia	3	6	1	5	3
2	Barcelona Alusport	5	1	4	4	6

2011–12 Primera División winners
(Catalonia)
Barcelona Alusport
Second title

=== Quarter-finals ===
==== First leg ====
May 18, 2012	Triman Navarra	4–4 (a.e.t.) (3–4 p)	Inter Movistar	Pamplona
20:30 (UTC+2)	Mimi 17'; Rafa Usín 29'; Jesulito 31'; Juanra 34'	Report	Batería 6'; Hugo 34', 36'; Matamoros 40'	Stadium: Pabellón Universitario; Attendance: 2,200; Referee: Blázquez Sierra & Gª Donas Salvador
	Penalties
	Rafa Usín (penalty scored); Javi Eseverri (penalty missed); Carlitos (penalty scored); Jesulito (penalty scored); Ximbinha (penalty missed)		(penalty scored) Betão; (penalty missed) Eka; (penalty scored) Batería; (penalty scored) Rafa; (penalty scored) Álvaro

May 19, 2012	Carnicer Torrejón	1–2	FC Barcelona Alusport	Torrejón de Ardoz
18:30 (UTC+2)	Lin 19' (o.g.)	Report	Wilde 9'; Lozano 23'	Stadium: Jorge Garbajosa; Attendance: 2,000; Referee: Gallo Suárez & Velasco Martínez

May 19, 2012	A. Lobelle	3–3 (a.e.t.) (1–3 p)	Caja Segovia	Santiago de Compostela
19:00 (UTC+2)	David Ruiz 21', 31'; Aicardo 32'	Report	David 1', 30'; Sergio 13'	Stadium: Fontes do Sar; Attendance: 1,500; Referee: Felipe Madorrán & Gereta Ramírez
	Penalties
	Aicardo (penalty missed); Raúl Campos (penalty scored); Barroso (penalty missed); Rubi (penalty missed)		(penalty missed) Sergio; (penalty scored) Borja Blanco; (penalty scored) Lolo; (penalty missed) Borja; (penalty scored) Fabián

May 20, 2012	Umacon Zaragoza	5–3	ElPozo Murcia	Zaragoza
17:00 (UTC+2)	Nano Modrego 4'; Linares 19', 40'; Tejel 25'; Miguel 29'	Report	Álex 4'; Miguelín 8', 16'	Stadium: Siglo XXI; Attendance: 2,000; Referee: Sanzol Goñi & Urdánoz Apezteguía

==== Second leg ====
May 26, 2012	ElPozo Murcia	10–2	Umacon Zaragoza	Murcia
13:00 (UTC+2)	Gréllo 3'; Álex 4', 19', 26'; Esquerdinha 17'; Miguelín 23'; Adri 27'; Bebe 28', 36'; Dani Salgado 31'	Report	Keny 10'; Nano Modrego 36'	Stadium: Palacio de Deportes; Attendance: 3,800; Referee: Ponce Medero & Redondo Arenales

May 26, 2012	FC Barcelona Alusport	5–2	Carnicer Torrejón	Barcelona
13:00 (UTC+2)	Wilde 1'; Lozano 27', 39'; Lin 31'; Saad 35'	Report	Igor 1' (o.g.); Rivillos 4'	Stadium: Palau Blaugrana; Referee: Alonso Montesinos & Rubio Fajardo

May 26, 2012	Inter Movistar	7–2	Triman Navarra	Alcalá de Henares
13:00 (UTC+2)	Batería 1'; Betão 7'; Matías 22', 22', 35', 36'; Matamoros 25'	Report	Jesulito 14', 34'	Stadium: Caja Madrid; Attendance: 3,900; Referee: Moreno Reina & Ramos Marín

May 26, 2012	Caja Segovia	4–2	A. Lobelle	Segovia
16:00 (UTC+2)	David 3'; Borja 24', 26'; Sergio 30'	Report	Barroso 4'; Campos 30'	Stadium: Pedro Delgado; Attendance: 1,800; Referee: Fortes Pardo & Martínez Flores

==== Third leg ====
May 27, 2012	ElPozo Murcia	7–3	Umacon Zaragoza	Murcia
19:00 (UTC+2)	Esquerdinha 3', 10'; Bebe 8'; Dani Salgado 17'; Álex 22'; Miguelín 36'; Saúl 39'	Report	Joan 6'; Miguel 15'; Keny 32'	Stadium: Palacio de Deportes; Referee: Gutiérrez Lumbreras & Lope Díaz

=== Semi-finals ===
==== First leg ====
June 2, 2012	Inter Movistar	4–5 (a.e.t.)	FC Barcelona Alusport	Alcalá de Henares
13:00 (UTC+2)	Eka 8', 37', 44'; Batería 34'	Report	Sergio Lozano 13'; Wilde 20', 35', 45'; Fernandão 42'	Stadium: Caja Madrid; Attendance: 4,500; Referee: Martínez Segovia, Sánchez Molina

June 2, 2012	Caja Segovia	6–4	ElPozo Murcia	Segovia
18:30 (UTC+2)	Lolo 20'; Sergio 30', 31', 38'; David 33'; Blanco 40'	Report	Miguelín 4'; Esquerdinha 9', 19'; Álex 17'	Stadium: Pedro Delgado; Attendance: 2,000; Referee: Peña Díaz, Peña Gómez

==== Second leg ====
June 7, 2012	FC Barcelona Alusport	7–4	Inter Movistar	Barcelona
20:15 (UTC+2)	Sergio Lozano 6'; Gabriel 7'; Torras 9'; Javi Rodríguez 13'; Wilde 14'; Ari 32', 39'	Report	Matías 3'; Matamoros 6'; Batería 15'; Eka 32'	Stadium: Palau Blaugrana; Attendance: 3,000; Referee: Moreno Reina, Ramos Marín

June 7, 2012	ElPozo Murcia	4–3	Caja Segovia	Murcia
21:15 (UTC+2)	Gréllo 12'; Esquerdinha 30'; Álex 35'; Miguelín 35'	Report	Borja 17', 33'; Borja Blanco 40'	Stadium: Palacio de Deportes; Attendance: 4,200; Referee: Blázquez Sierra, Gª Donas Salvador

==== Third leg ====
June 9, 2012	ElPozo Murcia	4–1	Caja Segovia	Murcia
13:00 (UTC+2)	Kike 21'; Esquerdinha 24'; Álex 34', 35'	Report	Borja Blanco 39'	Stadium: Palacio de Deportes; Referee: Cordero Gallardo, Linares López

=== Final ===
==== First leg ====
June 12, 2012	ElPozo Murcia	3–5 (a.e.t.)	FC Barcelona Alusport	Murcia
21:30 (UTC+2)	Álex 5'; Igor 26' (o.g.); Gréllo 33'	Report	Sergio Lozano 10', 32'; Fernandão 16', 41'; Wilde 43'	Stadium: Palacio de Deportes; Attendance: 7,000; Referee: Gutiérrez Lumbreras, Lope Díaz

==== Second leg ====
June 15, 2012	FC Barcelona Alusport	1–6	ElPozo Murcia	Barcelona
22:00 (UTC+2)	Saad 38'	Report	Kike 1'; Miguelín 6' de Bail 15'; Bebe 26'; Álex 31', 37'	Stadium: Palau Blaugrana; Attendance: 3,000; Referee: Felipe Madorrán, Gereta Ramírez

==== Third leg ====
June 17, 2012	FC Barcelona Alusport	4–1	ElPozo Murcia	Barcelona
18:30 (UTC+2)	Lin 21'; Gabriel 26'; Sergio Lozano 29', 39'	Report	Miguelín 6'	Stadium: Palau Blaugrana; Attendance: 4,000; Referee: Gracia Marín, Múnez Carpintero

==== Fourth leg ====
June 23, 2012	ElPozo Murcia	5–4	FC Barcelona Alusport	Murcia
18:30 (UTC+2)	Miguelín 6'; Álex 14' de Bail 27'; Gréllo 34', 39'	Report	Wilde 6'; Sergio Lozano 11', 13'; Torras 37'	Stadium: Palacio de Deportes; Attendance: 7,200; Referee: Peña Díaz, Peña Gómez

==== Fifth & final leg ====
June 25, 2012	ElPozo Murcia	3–6 (a.e.t.)	FC Barcelona Alusport	Murcia
21:30 (UTC+2)	de Bail 13'; Esquerdinha 26'; Miguelín 27'	Report	Javi Rodríguez 15', 26'; Sergio Lozano 36', 41'; Wilde 43', 45'	Stadium: Palacio de Deportes; Attendance: 8,000; Referee: Gracia Marín, Gutiérrez Lumbreras

=== Relegation playoff ===
First round
5	Gáldar Gran Canaria	3	4
7	UMA Antequera	2	1
10	Unión África Ceutí	3	4
14th	Marfil Santa Coloma*	6	5

Second round
5	Gáldar Gran Canaria	2	2	2
14th	Marfil Santa Coloma*	1	3	6

- Marfil Santa Coloma remained in División de Honor.

== Top scorers ==
Rank	Scorer	Club	Goals
1	(Brazil) Esquerdinha	ElPozo Murcia	38
2	(Spain) Lozano	FC Barcelona Alusport	31
3	(Brazil) Wilde	FC Barcelona Alusport	29
4	(Spain) Rivillos	Carnicer Torrejón	24
5	(Brazil) Rafael	Inter Movistar	23
6	(Brazil) Eka	Inter Movistar	22
7	(Spain) Joan Linares	Unacon Zaragoza	22
8	(Spain) Miguelín	ElPozo Murcia	22
9	(Spain) Torras	FC Barcelona Alusport	21
10	(Spain) Blanco	Caja Segovia	20

== See also ==
- 2011–12 Segunda División de Futsal
- 2011–12 Copa del Rey de Futsal
- Futsal in Spain
