= 2010–11 Copa del Rey de Futsal =

2010–11 Copa del Rey
Tournament details
- Country: Spain
- Teams: 48

Final positions
- Champions: Barcelona Alusport
- Runner-up: Inter Movistar

Tournament statistics
- Matches played: 49

The 2010–11 Copa del Rey was the 1st staging of the Copa del Rey de Futsal. The competition began on December 8, 2010, and ended on May 7, 2011. The final was held at Pabellón Municipal Javier Lozano in Toledo.

== Calendar ==
Round	Date	Fixtures	Clubs	Notes
First round	8 December 2010	16	32 → 32	Clubs participating in Primera Nacional A and División de Plata gain entry.
Second Round	22 December 2010	16	32 → 16	Clubs participating in División de Honor gain entry.
Third Round	29 December 2010	8	16 → 8	
Fourth Round	11 January 2011	4	8 → 4	
Semifinals	22 March 2011	2	4 → 2	
Semifinals	29 March 2011	2	4 → 2	
Final	7 May 2011	1	2 → 1	

== Qualified teams ==
- 16 clubs of División de Honor
- 14 clubs of División de Plata
- 18 clubs of Primera Nacional

== First round ==
- Matches played on 8 December 2010.

Team 1	Result	Team 2
Mera	4 – 6	Burela
Auzoak Zierbena	5 – 2	Avilés Oquendo
Zalatambor	1 – 4	Rios Renovables Ribera Navarra
Alamín	3 – 4	Azulejos y Pavimentos Brihuega
Pinseque	8 – 7	Burgos
Finques Centelles	1 – 10	BP Andorra
Hospitalet Bellsport	4 – 6	Space Gasifred Ciutat d'Eivissa
Carballiño	2 – 3	Arcebansa Zamora
Solimar Albense	6 – 4	Extremadura Cáceres 2016
Grupo Disfarol Valdepeñas	1 – 4	Puertollano
Fonononos Gomerón	4 – 6	Gáldar
Fielsan Roldán	4 – 5	Restaurante Frontera Tobarra
La Nucía	6 – 4	Albacete 2010
Construcciones Gascó Alcoy	5 – 4	UPV-Maristas Valencia
Elefrío Aquasierra	0 – 3	Melilla
Linares	2 – 4	Fuconsa Jaén

== Second round ==
- Matches played on 22 December 2010.

Team 1	Result	Team 2
Burela	1 – 9	Xacobeo 2010 Lobelle
Auzoak Zierbena	2 – 4	Azkar Lugo
Rios Renovables Ribera Navarra	2 – 4	Triman Navarra
Azulejos y Pavimentos Brihuega	2 – 5	Sala 10 Zaragoza
Pinseque	1 – 5	Marfil Santa Coloma
BP Andorra	2 – 5	Barcelona Alusport
Space Gasifred Ciutat d'Eivissa	1 – 4	Fisiomedia Manacor
Arcebansa Zamora	1 – 6	Caja Segovia
Solimar Albense	1 – 3	OID Talavera
Puertollano	6 – 2	Gestesa Guadalajara
Gáldar	4 – 5	Inter Movistar
Restaurante Frontera Tobarra	3 – 8	Carnicer Torrejón
La Nucía	1 – 7	Benicarló Aeroport Castelló
Construcciones Gascó Alcoy	1 – 0	Playas de Castellón
Melilla	0 – 4	ElPozo Murcia
Fuconsa Jaén	6 – 3	Reale Cartagena

== Third round ==
- Matches played on 29 December 2010.

Team 1	Result	Team 2
Marfil Sta. Coloma	0 – 2	Barcelona
C. Torrejón	2 – 6	Caja Segovia
Puertollano	1 – 2	InterMovistar
Azkar Lugo	4 – 3	Lobelle Santiago
Fuconsa Jaén	1 – 6	ElPozo Murcia
Talavera	3 – 1	Manacor
Sala 10	6 – 2	Triman Navarra
Serelles Alcoy	2 – 5	Benicarló

== Final phase bracket ==
quarter-finals (11 January)
OID Talavera	2
Azkar Lugo	3
Benicarló Aeroport Castelló	3
Barcelona Alusport	5
Caja Segovia	6 (3)
ElPozo Murcia	6 (4)
Sala 10 Zaragoza	3
Inter Movistar	4

semi-finals (22 & 29 March)
Azkar Lugo	2	1
Barcelona Alusport	9	6
ElPozo Murcia	3	2
Inter Movistar	2	5

final (7 May – Toledo)
Barcelona Alusport	4
Inter Movistar	3

=== Final ===
May 7, 2011	Barcelona Alusport	4–3 (a.e.t.)	Inter Movistar	Toledo
20:00 (UTC+2)	Wilde 20'; Schumacher 34' (o.g.); Torras 48'; Lin 49'	Report	Eka 2'; Fernandão 26' (o.g.); Schumacher 41'	Stadium: Pabellón Javier Lozano; Attendance: 1,400; Referee: Martínez Segovia, Sánchez Molina
