= 2016 Copa de España de Futsal =

Copa de España Guadalajara 2016

Tournament details
- Host country: Spain
- Dates: 10 – 13 March
- Teams: 8
- Venue(s): Palacio Multiusos (in Guadalajara host cities)

Final positions
- Champions: Movistar Inter (9th title)
- Runners-up: ElPozo Murcia

Tournament statistics
- Matches played: 7
- Goals scored: 48 (6.86 per match)
- Attendance: 30,000 (4,286 per match)
- Best player(s): Carlos Ortiz

The 2016 Copa de España de Fútbol Sala is the 27th staging of the Copa de España de Fútbol Sala. It takes place in Guadalajara, Castilla-La Mancha from 10 – 13 March. The matches are played at Palacio Multiusos for up to 5,894 seats. The tournament is hosted by Castilla-La Mancha regional government, Guadalajara municipality & LNFS. Ciudad Real hosts Copa de España for first time.

Defending champions are Jaén Paraíso Interior, that caused a great upset last year when defeated seeded No.3, FC Barcelona in the Final could not defend the title due to failed to qualify to the tournament.

Movistar Inter won its ninth title after defeating ElPozo Murcia 2–1 in the Final.

== Qualified teams ==
The qualified teams were the eight first teams on standings at midseason.

#	Team	P	W	D	L	G+	G−	Dif	Pts
1	Movistar Inter	15	14	1	0	77	30	47	43
2	FC Barcelona Lassa	15	12	2	1	76	36	40	38
7	Magna Gurpea	15	9	3	3	63	37	26	30
3	ElPozo Murcia	15	9	3	3	59	40	19	30
4	Palma Futsal	15	7	4	4	47	38	9	25
6	Aspil Vidal R.N.	15	5	7	3	41	36	5	22
5	Catgas Energia S.C.	15	6	3	6	63	65	−2	21
8	Burela Pescados Rubén	15	6	3	6	49	59	−3	21

== Venue ==
Guadalajara
Palacio Multiusos
Capacity: 5,894
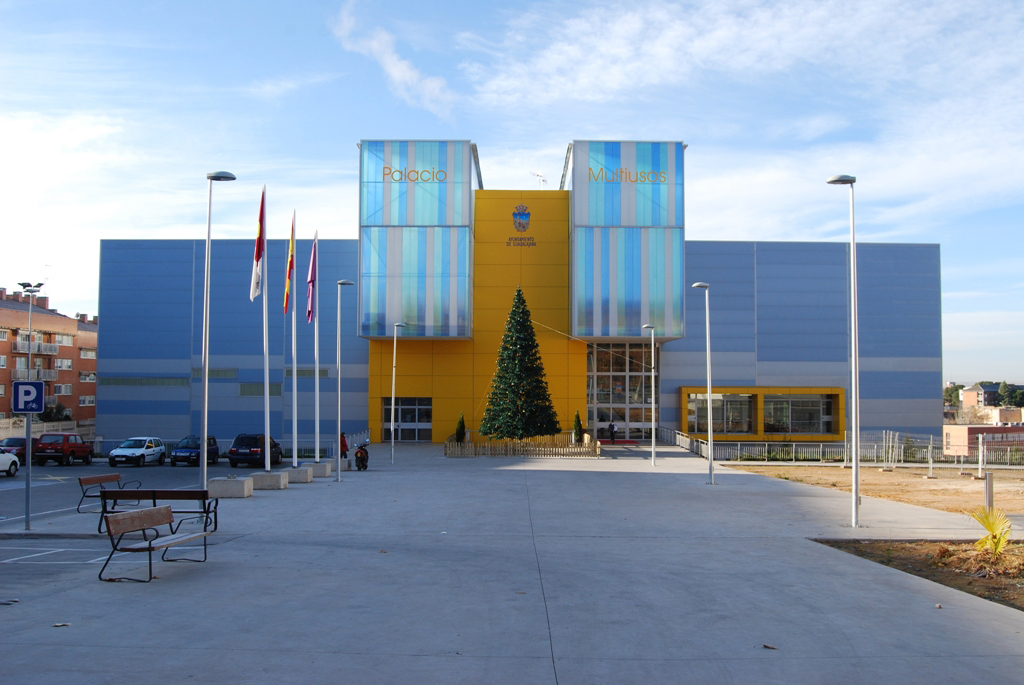

== Matches ==
Quarter-finals
7	Catgas Energia S.C.	4
8	Burela Pescados Rubén	6
1	Movistar Movistar	8
5	Palma Futsal	0
4	ElPozo Murcia	2
6	Aspil Vidal R.N.	1
2	FC Barcelona Lassa	5
3	Magna Gurpea	2

Semi-finals
8	Burela Pescados Rubén	3
1	Movistar Inter	6
4	ElPozo Murcia	5
2	FC Barcelona Lassa	3

Final
1	Movistar Inter	2
4	ElPozo Murcia	1

=== Quarter-finals ===
10 March	Catgas Energia S.C.	4–6	Burela Pescados Rubén	Guadalajara
19:00 (UTC+1)	Adolfo 13', 39'; Dani Salgado 16', 35'	Report	Petry 9', 17'; Chano 9'; Míguez 15'; Antoñito 16'; Chino 32'	Stadium: Palacio Multiusos; Attendance: 3,000; Referee: Gutiérrez Lumbreras, Lope Díaz

10 March	Movistar Inter	8–0	Palma Futsal	Guadalajara
21:15 (UTC+1)	Rafael 13', 36'; Borja 24', 33'; Ortiz 24'; Darlan 26'; Rivillos 30'; Daniel 32'	Report		Stadium: Palacio Multiusos; Attendance: 4,000; Referee: Peña Díaz, Peña Gómez

11 March	ElPozo Murcia	2–1	Aspil Vidal R.N.	Guadalajara
19:00 (UTC+1)	Álex 4'; Raúl Campos 6'	Report	Joselito 16'	Stadium: Palacio Multiusos; Attendance: 4,000; Referee: Juan Cerdá, Martínez García

11 March	FC Barcelona Lassa	5–2	Magna Gurpea	Guadalajara
21:15 (UTC+1)	Sergio Lozano 12'; Batería 14', 15', 34'; Wilde 20'	Report	Eseverri 1'; Rafa Usín 24'	Stadium: Palacio Multiusos; Attendance: 4,000; Referee: Rabadán Sáinz, Martínez Flores

=== Semi-finals ===
12 March	Burela Pescados Rubén	3–6	Movistar Inter	Guadalajara
18:00 (UTC+1)	Chino 8'; Hélder 10'; Míguez 25'	Report	Ortiz 11'; Rafael 12'; Herrero 16'; Borja 20'; Cardinal 33'; Ricardinho 39'	Stadium: Palacio Multiusos; Attendance: 5,000; Referee: Juan Cerdá, Martínez García

12 March	ElPozo Murcia	5–3	FC Barcelona Lassa	Guadalajara
20:15 (UTC+1)	Saad 19' (o.g.); Lima 24'; Bebe 27'; Miguelín 32'; Matteus 40'	Report	Tolrà 16'; Sergio Lozano 20'; Batería 27'	Stadium: Palacio Multiusos; Attendance: 5,000; Referee: Gutiérrez Lumbreras, Lope Díaz

=== Final ===
13 March	Movistar Inter	2–1	ElPozo Murcia	Guadalajara
20:15 (UTC+1)	Carlos Ortiz 21'; Ricardinho 23'	Report	Bebe 20'	Stadium: Palacio Multiusos; Attendance: 5,000; Referee: Peña Díaz, Peña Gómez

2016 Copa de España winners
(Community of Madrid)
Movistar Inter
Ninth title

== See also ==
- 2015–16 Primera División de Futsal
- 2015–16 Copa del Rey de Futsal
