= 2014 Copa de España de Futsal =

Copa de España Logroño 2014

Tournament details
- Host country: Spain
- Dates: 13 – 16 March
- Teams: 8
- Venue: Palacio de los Deportes (in Logroño host cities)

Final positions
- Champions: Inter Movistar (8th title)
- Runners-up: ElPozo Murcia

Tournament statistics
- Matches played: 7
- Goals scored: 46 (6.57 per match)
- Attendance: 26,100 (3,729 per match)
- Top scorer: three players 4
- Best player: Ricardinho

The 2014 Copa de España de Fútbol Sala was the 25th staging of the Copa de España de Fútbol Sala. It took place in Logroño, La Rioja between 13 and 16 March. The matches were played at Palacio de los Deportes de La Rioja for up to 4,500 seats. The tournament was hosted by La Rioja regional government, Logroño municipality and LNFS. This was the second time that Logroño hosted Copa de España after the 2012 edition.

FC Barcelona Intersport was the defending champion, but lost to Inter Movistar in semifinal. Inter Movistar eventually won its eighth Copa de España trophy after winning against ElPozo Murcia 4–3 in the final.

== Qualified teams ==
The qualified teams were the eight first teams on standings at midseason.

#	Team	P	W	D	L	G+	G−	Dif	Pts
1	Inter Movistar	14	13	1	0	84	32	52	40
2	ElPozo Murcia	14	10	2	2	70	31	39	32
3	FC Barcelona Alusport	14	9	5	0	51	21	30	32
4	Marfil Santa Coloma	14	8	1	5	59	56	3	25
5	Santiago	14	6	4	4	41	32	9	22
6	Magna Navarra	14	7	1	6	43	51	−8	22
7	Montesinos Jumilla	14	6	2	6	43	48	−5	20
8	Ríos Renovables R.N.	14	5	3	6	32	38	−6	18

== Venue ==
Logroño
Palacio de los Deportes de La Rioja
Capacity: 4,500
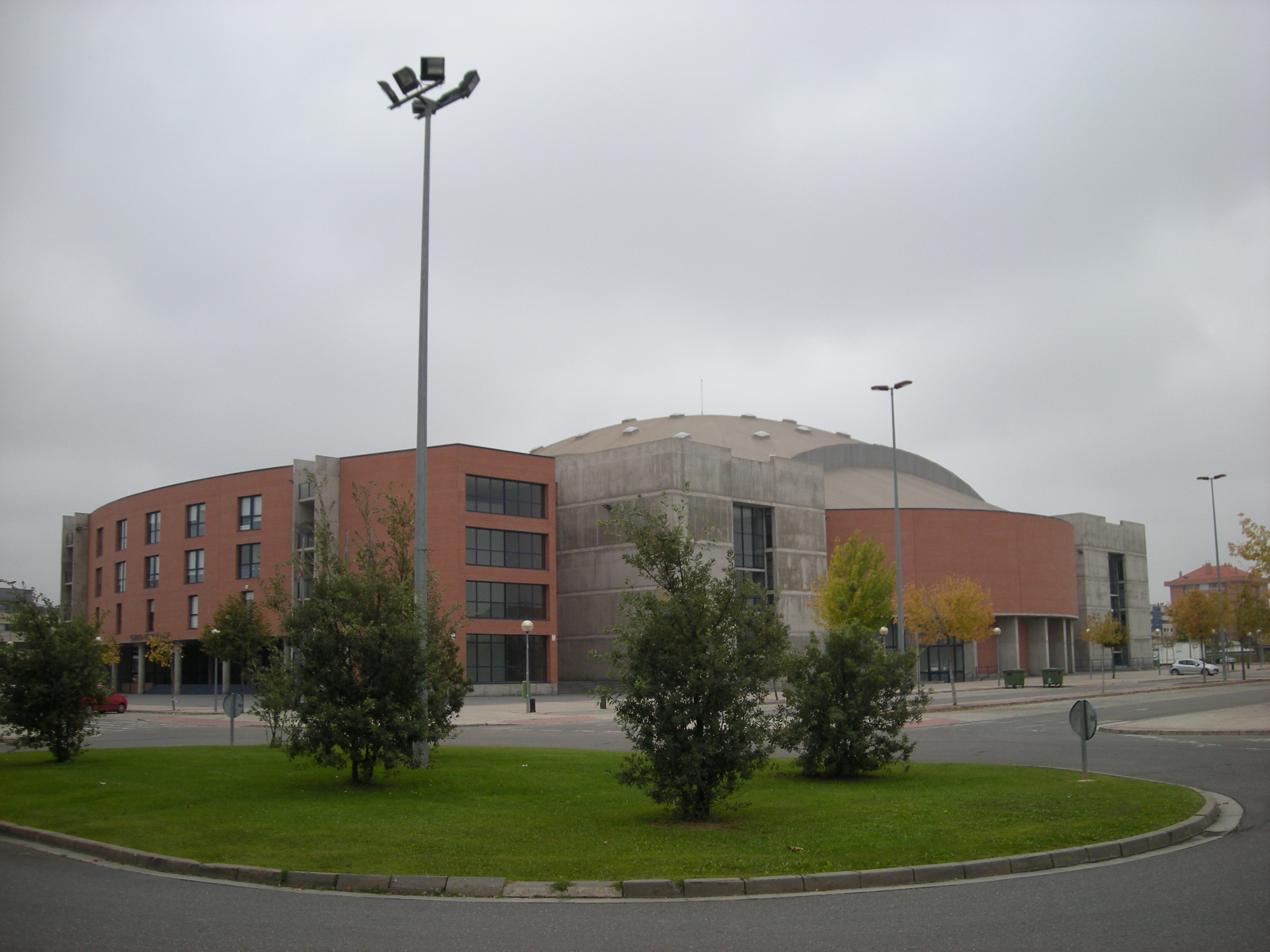

== Matches ==
Quarter-finals
1	Inter Movistar	3
6	Magna Navarra	1
3	FC Barcelona Alusport	7
8	Ríos Renovables R.N.	1
4	Marfil Santa Coloma	1
2	ElPozo Murcia	5
5	Santiago Futsal	8
7	Montesinos Jumilla	1

Semi-finals
1	Inter Movistar	6
3	FC Barcelona Alusport	1
2	ElPozo Murcia	5
5	Santiago Futsal	0

Final
1	Inter Movistar	4
2	ElPozo Murcia	3

=== Quarter-finals ===
13 March	Inter Movistar	3–1	Magna Navarra	Logroño
19:00 (UTC+1)	Ortiz 4'; Borja 35'; Tobe 40'	Report	Martil 32'	Stadium: Palacio de los Deportes; Attendance: 3,500; Referee: Cordero Gallardo, Linares López

13 March	FC Barcelona Alusport	7–1	Ríos Renovables R.N.	Logroño
21:15 (UTC+1)	Wilde 1', 8', 9', 22'; Lin 22'; Aicardo 23'; Roger 36'	Report	Palmas 29'	Stadium: Palacio de los Deportes; Attendance: 4,000; Referee: Gutiérrez Lumbreras, Lope Díaz

14 March	Santiago	8–1	Montesinos Jumilla	Logroño
19:00 (UTC+1)	Quintela 2', 40'; Hugo Sánchez 4'; Rojas 15'; Hamza 21'; Pazos 23'; David 23'; Pizarro 24' (o.g.)	Report	Lolo Suazo 17'	Stadium: Palacio de los Deportes; Attendance: 3,500; Referee: García Hernández, Díaz Rodríguez

14 March	Marfil Santa Coloma	1–5	ElPozo Murcia	Logroño
21:15 (UTC+1)	Adolfo 34'	Report	Álex 23', 31'; Miguelín 38', 38'; Gréllo 40'	Stadium: Palacio de los Deportes; Attendance: 3,500; Referee: Peña Díaz, Peña Gómez

=== Semi-finals ===
15 March	Inter Movistar	6–1	FC Barcelona Alusport	Logroño
18:00 (UTC+1)	Ricardinho 5', 23'; Batería 16', 36'; Pola 32'; Rivillos 39'	Report	Aicardo 32'	Stadium: Palacio de los Deportes; Attendance: 3,600; Referee: Peña Díaz, Peña Gómez

15 March	Santiago	0–5	ElPozo Murcia	Logroño
20:15 (UTC+1)		Report	Eka 1', 40'; Miguelín 15'; Raúl Campos 35'; Álex 38'	Stadium: Palacio de los Deportes; Attendance: 4,000; Referee: Díaz Rodríguez, García Hernández

=== Final ===
16 March	Inter Movistar	4–3	ElPozo Murcia	Logroño
20:00 (UTC+1)	Batería 4', 40'; Cardinal 14'; Nano Modrego 17'	Report	Álex 2'; Juampi 9'; Gréllo 38'	Stadium: Palacio de los Deportes; Attendance: 4,000; Referee: Cordero Gallardo, Linares López

2014 Copa de España winners
(Community of Madrid)
Inter Movistar
Eighth title

== Top 3 goalscorers ==
Rank	Name	Team	Goals	GpM
1	Batería	Inter Movistar	4	1,3
2	Álex	ElPozo Murcia	4	1,3
3	Wilde	FC Barcelona Alusport	4	2

Source: own compilation

== See also ==
- 2013–14 Primera División de Futsal
- 2013–14 Copa del Rey de Futsal
