= 2015 Copa de España de Futsal =

Copa de España Ciudad Real 2015

Tournament details
- Host country: Spain
- Dates: 12 – 15 March
- Teams: 8
- Venue(s): Quijote Arena (in Ciudad Real host cities)

Final positions
- Champions: Jaén Paraíso Interior (1st title)
- Runners-up: FC Barcelona

Tournament statistics
- Matches played: 7
- Goals scored: 35 (5 per match)
- Attendance: 32,000 (4,571 per match)
- Top scorer(s): Wilde 7

The 2015 Copa de España de Fútbol Sala is the 26th staging of the Copa de España de Fútbol Sala. It takes place in Ciudad Real, Castilla-La Mancha from 12 – 15 March. The matches are played at Quijote Arena for up to 5,863 seats. The tournament is hosted by Castilla-La Mancha regional government, Ciudad Real municipality & LNFS. Ciudad Real hosts Copa de España for first time.

Jaén Paraíso Interior caused a great upset when defeated seeded No.3, ElPozo Murcia in Quarter-finals & seeded No.3, FC Barcelona in the Final to win its first-ever title.

== Qualified teams ==
The qualified teams were the eight first teams on standings at midseason.

#	Team	P	W	D	L	G+	G−	Dif	Pts
1	Inter Movistar	15	12	3	0	61	35	26	39
2	FC Barcelona	15	12	1	2	80	34	46	37
3	ElPozo Murcia	15	11	3	1	71	31	40	36
4	Palma Futsal	15	10	0	5	66	55	11	30
5	Jaén Paraíso Interior	15	8	4	3	49	33	16	28
6	Aspil Vidal R.N.	15	8	3	4	51	46	5	27
7	Magna Navarra	15	7	3	5	54	47	7	24
8	Burela Pescados Rubén	15	7	1	7	54	51	3	22

== Venue ==
Ciudad Real
Quijote Arena
Capacity: 5,863
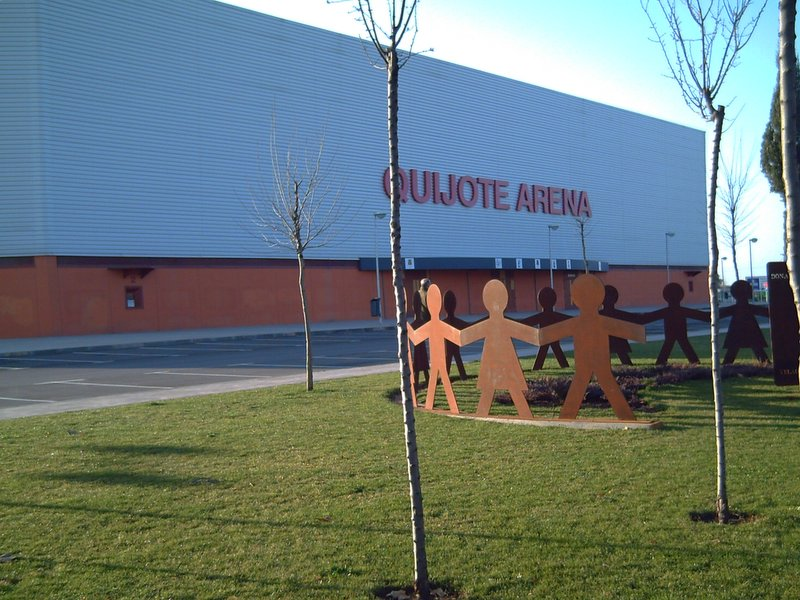

== Matches ==
Quarter-finals
3	ElPozo Murcia	2
5	Jaén Paraíso Interior	4
1	Inter Movistar	1
8	Burela Pescados Rubén	2
7	Magna Navarra	2
4	Palma Futsal	1
2	FC Barcelona	4
6	Aspil Vidal R.N.	0

Semi-finals
5	Jaén Paraíso Interior	2 (5)
8	Burela Pescados Rubén	2 (4)
7	Magna Navarra	1
2	FC Barcelona	4

Final
5	Jaén Paraíso Interior	6
2	FC Barcelona	4

=== Quarter-finals ===
12 March	ElPozo Murcia	2–4	Jaén Paraíso Interior	Ciudad Real
19:00 (UTC+1)	R Campos 4'; Juampi 28'	Report	Cuco 4'; Solano 24'; Buendía 25', 26'	Stadium: Quijote Arena; Attendance: 5,000; Referee: Gutiérrez Lumbreras, Lope Díaz

12 March	Inter Movistar	1–2	Burela Pescados Rubén	Ciudad Real
21:15 (UTC+1)	Rafael 25'	Report	Antoñito 33', 39'	Stadium: Quijote Arena; Attendance: 4,000; Referee: Fortes Pardo, Martínez Gómez

13 March	Magna Navarra	2–1	Palma Futsal	Ciudad Real
19:00 (UTC+1)	V Arévalo 6'; Carlitos 40'	Report	B Taffy 9'	Stadium: Quijote Arena; Attendance: 4,000; Referee: Moreno Reina, Ramos Marín

13 March	FC Barcelona	4–0	Aspil Vidal R.N.	Ciudad Real
21:15 (UTC+1)	Wilde 4', 9', 32'; Bateria 13'	Report		Stadium: Quijote Arena; Attendance: 4,000; Referee: Sánchez Molina, Martínez Segovia

=== Semi-finals ===
14 March	Jaén Paraíso Interior	2–2 (a.e.t.) (5–4 p)	Burela Pescados Rubén	Ciudad Real
17:30 (UTC+1)	Cuco 34'; Dani Martín 40'	Report	I Míguez 25'; Chano 33'	Stadium: Quijote Arena; Attendance: 5,000; Referee: Martínez Segovia, Sánchez Molina
	Penalties
	Rojas (penalty scored); Cuco (penalty scored); E Buendía (penalty scored); Carlinhos (penalty scored); Chino (penalty scored)		Matamoros (penalty scored); Chano (penalty scored); I Míguez (penalty scored); Antoñito (penalty scored); Miguel (penalty missed)

14 March	Magna Navarra	1–4	FC Barcelona	Ciudad Real
19:45 (UTC+1)	M Tolrá 38'	Report	Wilde 2', 27'; Bateria 4'; R Usín 27'	Stadium: Quijote Arena; Attendance: 5,000; Referee: Fortes Pardo, Martínez Flores

=== Final ===
15 March	Jaén Paraíso Interior	6–4	FC Barcelona	Ciudad Real
20:00 (UTC+1)	Solano 1'; Chino 15', 37'; E Buendía 29'; J López 35'; Cuco 37'	Report	Ferrão 19'; Saad 32'; Wilde 40', 40'	Stadium: Quijote Arena; Attendance: 5,000; Referee: Gutiérrez Lumbreras, Lope Díaz

2015 Copa de España winners
(Andalusia)
Jaén Paraíso Interior
First title

== See also ==
- 2014–15 Primera División de Futsal
- 2014–15 Copa del Rey de Futsal
