= 2011–12 Segunda División de Futsal =

Segunda División
- Season: 2011–12
- Promoted: Gáldar Gran Canaria & Burela Pescados Rubén
- Relegated: Hospitalet BellSport & Space Gasifred Ciutat dEivissa
- Top goalscorer: Diego Blanco (Sala 5 Martorell), 36 goals
- Biggest home win: Oxipharma 11–1 Fuconsa Jaén
- Biggest away win: Barcelona B Alusport 3–8 Sala 5 Martorell
- Highest scoring: Hospitalet BellSport 8–9 Space Gasifred Ciutat d'Eivissa

The 2011–12 season of the Segunda División de Futsal was the 19th season of second-tier futsal in Spain.

Oxipharma and Martorell were originally the promoted teams but both teams gave up due to financial reasons. Two vacancy seats were filled by Gáldar Gran Canaria and Burela Pescados Rubén.

== Teams ==
Location of Segunda División teams 2011–12
Canary Islands

Team	Location	Stadium	Capacity
Oxipharma	Albolote, Granada	Pabellón Municipal	1,700
Manzanares	Manzanares	Pabellón Municipal	600
ElPozo Ciudad de Murcia	Murcia	Palacio de Deportes	7,500
Fuconsa Jaén	Jaén	La Salobreja	1,200
Gáldar Gran Canaria	Gáldar	Juan Beltrán Sierra	1,500
Barcelona B Alusport	Barcelona	Pavelló Poliesportiu	472
UMA Antequera	Antequera	Fernando Argüelles	2,575
Sala 5 Martorell	Martorell	Pabellón Municipal	2,000
Burela Pescados Rubén	Burela	Vista Alegre	1,040
Unión África Ceutí	Ceuta	Guillermo Molina	500
Hotels Plaza Andorra	Andorra la Vella,	Poliesportiu d'Andorra	5,000
UPV Maristas Valencia	Valencia	Pavelló Poliesportiu	400
Melilla	Melilla	Javier Imbroda	3,800
L'Hospitalet Bellsport	L'Hospitalet de Llobregat	Poliesportiu Municipal	3,000
Space Gasifred Ciutat d'Ibiza	Ibiza Town	Poliesportiu Insular	2,000
Playas de Castellón	Castellón de la Plana	Ciutat de Castelló	6,000

== Regular season standings ==
	Team	Pld	W	D	L	GF	GA	Pts
1	~~Oxipharma~~*	30	18	5	7	141	91	59
2	~~Manzanares~~*	30	17	5	8	111	99	56
3	ElPozo Ciudad de Murcia*	30	14	7	9	114	98	49
4	Fuconsa Jaén	30	14	6	10	82	85	48
5	Gáldar Gran Canaria	30	14	5	11	123	112	47
6	Barcelona B Alusport*	30	13	7	10	118	113	46
7	UMA Antequera	30	12	9	9	104	91	45
8	~~Sala 5 Martorell~~*	30	12	8	10	130	110	44
9	Burela Pescados Rubén	30	12	8	10	94	85	44
10	~~Unión África Ceutí~~*	30	13	3	14	118	128	42
11	Hotels Plaza Andorra	30	12	5	13	105	103	41
12	UPV Maristas Valencia	30	8	10	12	110	112	34
13	Melilla	30	10	1	19	87	108	31
14	Hospitalet BellSport	30	8	7	15	109	126	31
15	Space Gasifred Ciutat d'Eivissa	30	8	6	16	105	128	30
16	Playas de Castellón*	30	7	4	19	91	153	25

direct promotion	promotion playoffs	relegated

- ElPozo Ciudad de Murcia and Barcelona B Alusport did not play the promotion playoffs due to be reserve teams.
- Oxipharma gives up to promotion for failing to meet the LNFS financial criteria to play in Primera División.
- Playas de Castellón, although finished in 16th position on standings, was readmitted in Segunda División due to vacant seats.
- Manzanares, Sala 5 Martorell & Unión Africa Ceutí, were relegated for failing to meet the LNFS financial criteria to play in Segunda División.

== Promotion playoffs ==
=== Bracket ===
1st round
2	Manzanares	1	2 (3)
9	Burela Pescados Rubén	3	2 (5)
4	Fuconsa Jaén	2	5	1
8	Sala 5 Martorell	5	2	2
5	Gáldar Gran Canaria	3	4
7	UMA Antequera	2	1
10	Unión África Ceutí	3	4
14th	Marfil Santa Coloma	6	5

2nd round
9	Burela Pescados Rubén	2 (5)	2	1
8	Sala 5 Martorell	2 (4)	3	5
5	Gáldar Gran Canaria	2	2	2
14th	Marfil Santa Coloma	1	3	6

Qualified
P	~~Sala 5 Martorell~~
R	Marfil Santa Coloma

=== 1st round ===
==== 1st leg ====
May 19, 2012	Sala 5 Martorell	5–2	Fuconsa Jaén	Martorell
18:00 (CEST)	Blanco 20', 31'; Peramos 21'; Areny 29'; Nelo 39'	Report	Solano 33'; Lonchu 38'	Stadium: Municipal de Martorell; Referee: Bernabéu Haro, González Ruano

May 19, 2012	UMA Antequera	2–3	Gáldar Gran Canaria	Antequera
18:00 (CEST)	Claudio da Silva 25'; Flores 34'	Report	Minhoca 8'; Cachón 31', 39'	Stadium: Fernando Argüelles; Attendance: 1,200; Referee: Pons Rodríguez, Sarrat Nuevo

May 19, 2012	Burela Pescados Rubén	3–1	Manzanares	Burela
18:45 (CEST)	Míguez 2'; Clebinho 6'; Juanma 31'	Report	Juanillo 37'	Stadium: Vista Alegre; Attendance: 700; Referee: González Moreta, Sánchez Chamorro

May 19, 2012	Unión África Ceutí	3–6	Marfil Santa Coloma	Ceuta
20:00 (CEST)	Pablo Ángel 19', 38'; Salvi 36'	Report	Jhow 3', 5', 38' del Barco 18'; Rubén 34'; Adolfo 39'	Stadium: Guillermo Molina; Attendance: 800; Referee: Cordero Gallardo, Linares López

==== 2nd leg ====
May 25, 2012	Manzanares	2–2 (a.e.t.) (3–5 p)	Burela Pescados Rubén	Manzanares
20:45 (CEST)	Kike 7'; Kiki 35'	Report	André 20'; Juanma 39'	Stadium: Municipal de Manzanares; Attendance: 600; Referee: Faubell Zaldívar, Santander Flamarique
	Penalties
	de la Cuerda (penalty scored); Juanillo (penalty missed); Zamo (penalty scored); Kiki (penalty scored)		(penalty scored) Purao; (penalty scored) Christian; (penalty scored) Ique; (penalty scored) Juanma; (penalty scored) Clebinho

May 26, 2012	Fuconsa Jaén	5–2	Sala 5 Martorell	Jaén
18:00 (CEST)	Lolo Jarque 17'; Minu 23'; Sergio 24'; Solano 31'; Emilio 39'	Report	Gay 18'; Kiko 29'	Stadium: La Salobreja; Attendance: 800; Referee: Moreno Culebras, Royuela Ayllón

May 26, 2012	Marfil Santa Coloma	5–4 (a.e.t.)	Unión Africa Ceutí	S.C. de Gramenet
18:30 (CEST)	Jhow 14', 30'; Adolfo 18' del Barco 27'; Redondo 42'	Report	Toro 7', 33'; Chito 31', 33'	Stadium: Jacint Verdaguer; Referee: Contreras Tejedor, Pérez Álvarez

May 26, 2012	Gáldar Gran Canaria	4–1	UMA Antequera	Gáldar
19:00 (WEST)	Néstor 7'; Glauber 16', 38'; Minhoca 35'	Report	Álex 10'	Stadium: Juan Vega Mateos; Referee: de las Heras Lombilla, Pérez Pérez

==== 3rd leg ====
May 27, 2012	Fuconsa Jaén	1–2	Sala 5 Martorell	Jaén
12:30 (CEST)	Solano 33'	Report	Jordi 12'; Blanco 12'	Stadium: La Salobreja; Referee: Carpintero Pedraza, Rodrigo Miguel

=== 2nd round ===
==== 1st leg ====
June 1, 2012	Burela Pescados Rubén	2–2 (a.e.t.) (5–4 p)	Sala 5 Martorell	Burela
20:45 (CEST)	Míguez 17', 34'	Report	Blanco 4'; Kiko 37'	Stadium: Vista Alegre; Attendance: 1,200; Referee: Miguel Velasco, Viedma Martín
	Penalties
	Purao (penalty scored); Christian (penalty scored); Ique (penalty scored); Juanma (penalty missed); Clebinho (penalty scored); Víctor (penalty scored)		(penalty scored) Guille Aubach; (penalty missed) Cintu; (penalty scored) Jordi; (penalty scored) Diego Blanco; (penalty scored) Marc Areny; (penalty missed) Suzuki

June 2, 2012	Gáldar Gran Canaria	2–1 (a.e.t.)	Marfil Santa Coloma	Gáldar
19:00 (WEST)	Minhoca 9', 45'	Report	Rubén 17'	Stadium: Juan Vega Mateos; Attendance: 1,500; Referee: Gracia Marín, Múnez Carpintero

==== 2nd leg ====
June 8, 2012	Marfil Santa Coloma	3–2	Gáldar Gran Canaria	S.C. de Gramenet
20:30 (CEST)	Rubén 12'; Hugo 25'; Adolfo 32'	Report	Cachón 8'; Minhoca 16'	Stadium: Jacint Verdaguer; Referee: Gutiérrez Lumbreras, Lope Díaz

June 9, 2012	Sala 5 Martorell	3–2	Burela Pescados Rubén	Martorell
18:00 (CEST)	Àlex Peramos 3'; Marc Areny 14', 37'	Report	Ique 14'; Iago Míguez 21'	Stadium: Municipal de Martorell; Referee: Faubell Zaldívar, Santander Flamarique

==== 3rd leg ====
June 9, 2012	Marfil Santa Coloma	6–2	Gáldar Gran Canaria	S.C. de Gramenet
18:30 (CEST)	Adolfo 9'; Jhow 18' del Barco 31'; Rubén 36', 38'	Report	Julio 19'; Zeus 25'	Stadium: Jacint Verdaguer; Referee: Alonso Montesinos, Rubio Fajardo

June 10, 2012	Sala 5 Martorell	5–1	Burela Pescados Rubén	Martorell
20:30 (CEST)	Blanco 2'; Areny 32', 36'; Jordi 38'; Cintu 39'	Report	Clebinho 39'	Stadium: Municipal de Martorell; Attendance: 2,000; Referee: Bernabéu Haro, González Ruano

- Sala 5 Martorell gives up to promotion to Primera División for failing to find a main sponsor that provides the required budget to play in Primera División. Also gives up to play in Segunda División.

Promoted to Primera División
Gáldar Gran Canaria (18 years later)	Burela Pescados Rubén (First time ever)

== Top goal scorers ==
Player	Goals	Team
(Spain) Diego Blanco	36	Sala 5 Martorell
(Brazil) Beto	29	Playas de Castellón
(Spain) Néstor Gómez	29	Gáldar Gran Canaria
(Brazil) Leo	27	Space Gasifred Ciutat d'Eivissa
(Brazil) Paulinho	27	Oxipharma
(Spain) Lolo Suazo	26	ElPozo Ciudad de Murcia
(Spain) Marc Areny	26	Sala 5 Martorell
(Brazil) Cabinho	24	Hotels Plaza Andorra
(Brazil) Franklin	24	ElPozo Ciudad de Murcia
(Spain) Juanillo	24	Melilla

== See also ==
- 2011–12 Primera División de Futsal
- 2011–12 Copa del Rey de Futsal
- Segunda División B de Futsal
