= Olivo Arena =

Indoor sporting arena in Jaén, Spain

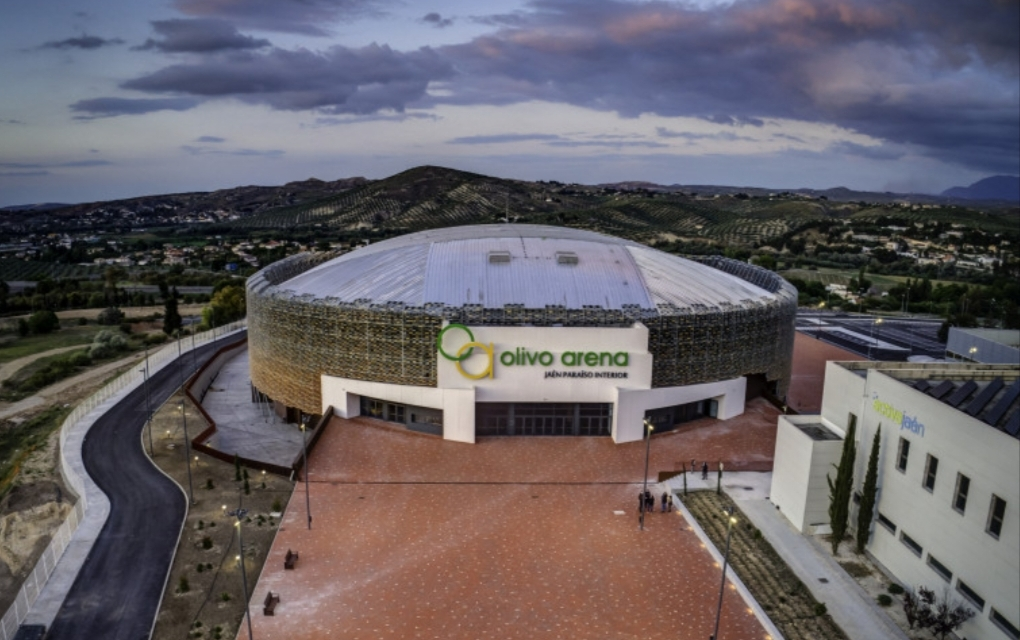
- Interactive map of Olivo Arena
- Location: Jaén, Spain
- Coordinates: 37.77922°N 3.75428°W
- Owner: Government of Jaén Province
- Capacity: 6,589 (main court); 6,403 (concerts)
- Surface: Parquet Floor

Construction
- Groundbreaking: 2019
- Built: 2021
- Opened: 1 July 2021
- Cost: €20,5m
- Architects: María Dolores Mateos, Esperanza Romero & Jon Caño
- General contractor: Construcciones Calderón

Tenant
- Jaén FS

Olivo Arena is an indoor sporting arena located in Jaén, Andalusia, Spain. Its full capacity is 6,589 people in the sport mode.

== History ==
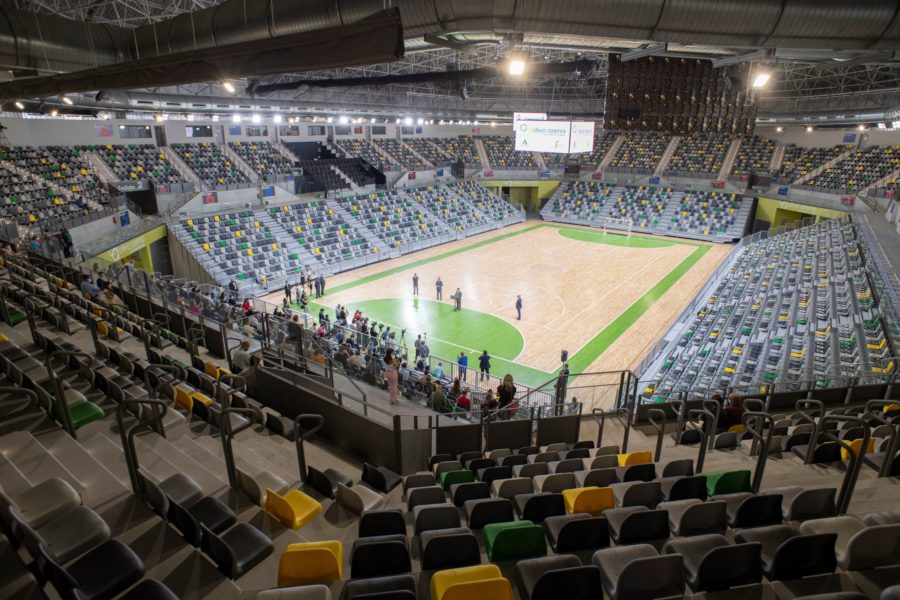
Inside of the Olivo Arena in October 2021

Located in the place of the fair and congress center IFEJA, the Arena started to be built in May 2019.

The Olivo Arena was finally inaugurated on 01 July 2021 to become the new home of the local futsal team Jaén FS, playing the Primera División de Futsal; also is used to host differents events such as concerts or other sports games.

From 31 de March to 3 of April 2022 the Futsal Spain Cup was held
From 14 de May to 15 of May 2022 the Futsal Copa del Rey was held
In 29 November of 2023 it hosted the first game in the history of the city of Jaén to celebrate the Spanish national basketball team, in a qualifying match against Georgia for the FIBA Basketball World Cup.

== See also ==
- List of indoor arenas in Spain
