= Iuliu Safar =

Romanian futsal player

Personal information
- Full name: Iuliu Safar
- Date of birth: 22 April 1985 (age 41)
- Place of birth: Romania
- Position: Ala

Senior career*
Years	Team	Apps	(Gls)
–2011	Berettyóújfalu		
2011–12	Gáldar	12	(4)

International career
- Romania
- * Club domestic league appearances and goals

Iuliu Safar (born 22 April 1985) is a Romanian futsal player who plays as an Ala.
