= 2013–14 Segunda División de Futsal =

21st season of second-tier futsal in Spain

Segunda División
- Season: 2013–14
- Promoted: Levante UD DM & Uruguay Tenerife
- Relegated: L'Hospitalet Bellsport
- Matches played: 156
- Goals scored: 1,106 (7.09 per match)
- Top goalscorer: Carlos Corvo, 33
- Biggest home win: Plásticos Romero Cartagena 10–0 O'Parrulo
- Biggest away win: O'Parrulo 1–9 Hércules San Vicente
- Highest scoring: Segovia Futsal 9–5 O'Parrulo; ElPozo Ciudad de Murcia 5–9 Elche

The 2013–14 Segunda División de Futsal season is the 21st season of second-tier futsal in Spain since its inception in 1993.

The season comprises regular season and promotion playoff. Regular season 1st matchday started on September 21, 2013 and finished on May 3, 2014. After finishing regular season, top team is promoted to Primera División while the next four teams at standings play promotion playoff.

Promotion playoff began on 10 May with semifinals to best of three games. Winner of promotion playoff will be promoted to Primera División 2014–15.

== Teams ==
Location of Segunda División teams 2013–14
Canary Islands

Team	Location	Stadium	Capacity
ElPozo Ciudad de Murcia	Murcia	Palacio de Deportes	7,500
FC Barcelona B Alusport	Barcelona	Pavelló Poliesportiu	472
Levante UD DM	Valencia	El Cabanyal	1,000
Melilla	Melilla	Javier Imbroda	3,800
UMA Antequera	Antequera, Andalusia	Fernando Argüelles	2,575
Plásticos Romero	Cartagena, Region of Murcia	Wsell de Guimbarda	2,500
Uruguay–Tenerife	Santa Cruz de Tenerife	La Salud	500
Segovia Futsal	Segovia, Castile and León	Pedro Delgado	2,800
Brihuega	Brihuega, Castile-La Mancha	Virgen de la Peña	500
L'Hospitalet Bellsport	L'Hospitalet de Llobregat, Catalonia	Sergio Manzano	500
O'Parrulo	Ferrol, Galicia	A Malata	5,000
Elche	Elche, Valencian Community	Esperanza Lag	2,000
Hércules San Vicente	San Vicente del Raspeig, Valencian Community	Polideportivo Municipal	700

== Regular season standings ==
	Team	Pld	W	D	L	GF	GA	Pts
1	Levante UD DM	24	18	1	5	97	61	55
2	Uruguay Tenerife	24	15	4	5	121	79	49
3	Elche	24	14	6	4	104	69	48
4	FC Barcelona B Alusport	24	12	7	5	94	69	43
5	Plásticos Romero Cartagena	24	12	3	9	100	89	39
6	ElPozo Ciudad de Murcia	24	10	5	9	86	83	35
7	Brihuega	24	11	2	11	91	79	35
8	Melilla	24	9	6	9	73	72	33
9	L'Hospitalet Bellsport	24	8	6	10	80	83	30
10	Segovia Futsal	24	8	4	12	82	95	28
11	UMA Antequera	24	8	2	14	65	86	26
12	Hércules San Vicente	24	5	5	14	68	83	20
13	O'Parrulo	24	0	1	23	45	158	1

FC Barcelona B and ElPozo Ciudad de Murcia can't play promotion playoff due its reserve team status.

Promoted	promotion playoffs	Relegated

== Promotion playoffs ==
1st round
Uruguay Tenerife	3	3	8
Brihuega	4	2	5
Elche	2	4	7
Plásticos Romero Cartagena	5	3	6

Final
Uruguay Tenerife	4	5	6
Elche	5	4	4

=== 1st round ===
==== 1st leg ====
May 10, 2014	Brihuega	4–3	Uruguay Tenerife	Brihuega
18:00 (UTC+02)	Blecua 6', 26', 33'; Carlos 37'	Report	Pedro Toro 10'; Corvo 30'; Jacinto 31'	Stadium: Virgen de la Peña; Attendance: 700; Referee: González Moreta, Sánchez Chamorro

May 10, 2014	Plásticos Romero Cartagena	5–2	Elche	Cartagena
18:00 (UTC+02)	Blanco 12'; Cánovas 14', 39'; Joaquín 23'; Juanfran 36'	Report	Óscar 11'; Kiwi 35'	Stadium: Wsell de Guimbarda; Attendance: 1,000; Referee: Carrillo Arroyo, Fernández Domínguez

==== 2nd leg ====
May 16, 2014	Uruguay Tenerife	3–2	Brihuega	Santa Cruz de Tenerife
20:30 (UTC+01)	Pedro Toro 7'; Pablo 10'; Ayose 25'	Report	Carlos 20', 38'	Stadium: Palacio Municipal de Deportes; Attendance: 3,500; Referee: Hidalgo Marín, Marín Márquez

May 16, 2014	Elche	4–3	Plásticos Romero Cartagena	Elche
21:00 (UTC+02)	Óscar 5'; Carde 12'; Pitu 18'; Juanjo 32'	Report	Javi Matía 23'; Pedreño 33'; Kiwi 36' (o.g.)	Stadium: Esperanza Lag; Attendance: 1,500; Referee: Juan Cerda, Martínez García

==== 3rd leg ====
May 17, 2014	Elche	7–6	Plásticos Romero Cartagena	Elche
20:30 (UTC+02)	Manu 6'; Óscar 10'; Pitu 11', 33'; Juandi 22'; J García 23'; Kiwi 24'	Report	Jordi 11'; E Cánovas 21', 25'; S Rivero 28', 29', 32'	Stadium: Esperanza Lag; Attendance: 1,700; Referee: Carpintero Pedraza, Rodrigo Miguel

May 18, 2014	Uruguay Tenerife	8–5 (a.e.t.)	Brihuega	Santa Cruz de Tenerife
12:00 (UTC+01)	V Suazo 10'; Corvo 12', 18', 23', 43', 45'; Pablo 29'; P Toro 43'	Report	Párraga 29', 35'; Blecua 33', 33', 36'	Stadium: Palacio Municipal de Deportes; Referee: Pons Rodríguez, Sarrat Nuevo

=== Final ===
==== 1st leg ====
May 23, 2014	Elche	5–4	Uruguay Tenerife	Elche
21:00 (UTC+02)	Jesús García 3'; Carde 12'; Juanjo 22'; Juanjito 34'; Juandi 35'	Report	Ayose 5', 25', 31'; Luis Jara 40'	Stadium: Esperanza Lag; Attendance: 1,693; Referee: Juan Cerda, Martínez Flores

==== 2nd leg ====
May 30, 2014	Uruguay Tenerife	5–4	Elche	Santa Cruz de Tenerife
21:00 (UTC+01)	V Suazo 18', 37'; Corvo 31', 40'; Kike Barroso 35'	Report	Kiwi 20', 22'; Manu 23'; Pitu 37'	Stadium: Palacio Municipal de Deportes; Attendance: 4,500; Referee: Carpintero Pedraza, Rodrigo Miguel

==== 3rd leg ====
June 1, 2014	Uruguay Tenerife	6–4	Elche	Santa Cruz de Tenerife
12:00 (UTC+01)	Ayose 2'; Pedro Toro 18'; Kike Barroso 20', 39'; Jacinto 22'; Corvo 34'		Óscar 8'; Carde 38', 40', 40'	Stadium: Palacio Municipal de Deportes; Attendance: 5,000; Referee: Arance García, del Olmo Martínez

Uruguay Tenerife won series 2–1 and promoted to Primera División.

Promoted to Primera División
Uruguay Tenerife
(First time ever)

== Top scorers ==
Rank	Player	Club	Goals
1	(Spain) Jordi Lledó	Levante UD DM	28
2	(Spain) Carlos Corvo	Uruguay–Tenerife	27
3	(Spain) Pedro Toro	Uruguay–Tenerife	22
4	(Spain) Guille Aubach	L'Hospitalet Bellsport	21
5	(Spain) Pitu	Elche	20

== See also ==
- 2013–14 Primera División de Futsal
- 2013–14 Copa del Rey de Futsal
- Segunda División B de Futsal
