= 2015–16 Segunda División de Futsal =

Segunda División
- Season: 2015–16
- Promoted: Plásticos Romero Cartagena & Gran Canaria
- Relegated: Cidade de Narón & Zamora
- Matches played: 182
- Goals scored: 1,245 (6.84 per match)
- Top goalscorer: Fabricio, (Hercules San Vicente), 38
- Biggest home win: Hércules San Vicente 10–0 Cidade de Narón
- Biggest away win: Puertollano 4–11 ElPozo Ciudad de Murcia
- Highest scoring: Hércules San Vicente 9–7 Gran Canaria

The 2015–16 Segunda División de Futsal season was the 23rd season of second-tier futsal in Spain since its inception in 1993.

The season comprises regular season and promotion playoff. Regular season began on September 19, 2015 and finished on April 17, 2016. After completing 26 matches, top team is promoted to Primera División, teams qualified in 2–5 place play promotion playoff while the bottom team is relegated Segunda División B.

Promotion playoff kick-off on April 23/24, playing semifinals and Final to the best of 3 matches. Winner of promotion playoff will be promoted to Primera División 2016–17.

== Teams ==
Location of Segunda División teams 2015–16
Canary Islands

Team	Location	Stadium	Capacity
FC Barcelona Lassa B	Barcelona	Pavelló Poliesportiu	472
Valdepeñas	Valdepeñas, Castile-La Mancha	Virgen de la Cabeza	1,100
Naturpellet Segovia	Segovia	Pedro Delgado	2,800
Gran Canaria	Las Palmas de Gran Canaria	Centro Insular	5,000
Melilla	Melilla	Javier Imbroda	3,800
Plásticos Romero	Cartagena	Wsell de Guimbarda	2,500
ElPozo Ciudad de Murcia	Murcia	Palacio de Deportes	7,500
Cofersa O'Parrulo	Ferrol	A Malata	5,000
Hércules San Vicente	San Vicente del Raspeig, Alicante	Polideportivo Municipal	700
~~Zamora~~	Zamora	Ángel Nieto	2,200
Prone Lugo	Lugo	Pavillón Municipal	2,500
Real Betis FSN	Dos Hermanas, Seville	Francisco de Dios Jiménez	1,500
Cidade de Narón	Narón, Galicia	A Gándara	1,200
Puertollano	Puertollano, Ciudad Real	Antonio Rivilla	2,500

== Regular season standings ==
Pos	Team	Pld	W	D	L	GF	GA	GD	Pts	Qualification or relegation
1	ElPozo Ciudad de Murcia	26	19	2	5	139	85	+54	59	
2	Plásticos Romero	26	18	3	5	104	74	+30	57	Promoted
3	Valdepeñas	26	16	6	4	103	77	+26	54	Qualification to the promotion playoffs
4	FC Barcelona Lassa B	26	16	4	6	101	69	+32	52	
5	Hércules San Vicente	26	16	3	7	129	81	+48	51	Qualification to the promotion playoffs
6	Naturpellet Segovia	26	13	5	8	90	76	+14	44	Qualification to the promotion playoffs
7	Gran Canaria	26	14	1	11	107	76	+31	43	Qualification to the promotion playoffs
8	Real Betis FSN	26	13	2	11	102	89	+13	41	
9	O'Parrulo	26	9	5	12	92	92	0	32	
10	Puertollano	26	9	3	14	74	116	−42	30	
11	Melilla	26	8	1	17	76	98	−22	22	
12	Prone Lugo	26	7	3	16	64	102	−38	22	
13	Cidade de Narón	26	3	2	21	38	102	−64	11	Relegation to Segunda División B
14	Zamora	26	1	0	25	26	108	−82	−2	Relegation to Segunda División B

Updated to match(es) played on 21 April 2016. Source: LNFS – Segunda División and lnfs.es
Rules for classification: 1) points; 2) head-to-head points; 3) head-to-head goal difference; 4) goal difference; 5) number of goals scored
- FS Zamora was disqualified on 30 December 2015 for steadily breaching competition rules.

deducted points:

- Prone Lugo; 2 points
- Melilla; 3 points
- Zamora; 5 points

== Promotion playoffs ==
=== Calendar ===
Round	Date	Fixtures	Clubs	Notes
Semifinals	23/24 April	2	4 → 2	
Semifinals	30 April/1 May	2	4 → 2	
Final	1 May	1	2 → 1	
Final	8 May	1	2 → 1	

=== Bracket ===
1st round
3	Valdepeñas	2	2
7	Gran Canaria	4	5
5	Hércules San Vicente	2	5	1^{(3)}
6	Naturpellet Segovia	5	2	1^{(4)}

Final
7	Gran Canaria	7	4
6	Naturpellet Segovia	1	3

=== Semifinals ===
==== 1st leg ====
April 23, 2016	Naturpellet Segovia	5–2	Hércules San Vicente	Segovia
18:00 (UTC+02)	Lucas 3'; Edu 15'; Álex Fuentes 25'; Juanfran 30'; Buitre 35'	Boxscore	Fabricio 19'; Peloncha 28'	Stadium: Pedro Delgado; Referee: Ferrero Carballal, Menéndez Nistral

April 24, 2016	Gran Canaria	4–2	Valdepeñas	Las Palmas
12:00 (UTC+01)	Salado 30', 35', 38'; Julio 40'	Boxscore	Juanlu 7'; Carlos 39'	Stadium: Centro Insular de Deportes; Referee: Gómez García, Moreno Durán

==== 2nd leg ====
April 29, 2016	Hércules San Vicente	5–2	Naturpellet Segovia	Sant Vicent del Raspeig
21:00 (UTC+02)	Cristian 3'; Miani 13'; Juanito 25', 35'; Juandi 29'	Boxscore	Lucas 2', 38'	Stadium: Polideportivo Municipal; Referee: Centeno Bono, Alberto & Jordi

April 29, 2016	Valdepeñas	2–5	Gran Canaria	Valdepeñas
21:00 (UTC+01)	Kike 37', 40'	Boxscore	Saúl 14'; Juanillo 23'; Anás 32'; Pepe 34'; Salado 40'	Stadium: Virgen de la Cabeza; Referee: Miñano Martínez, Ropero Lara

Gran Canaria won series 2–0 and advanced to Final.

==== 3rd leg ====
May 1, 2016	Hércules San Vicente	1–1 (a.e.t.) (3–4 p)	Naturpellet Segovia	Sant Vicent del Raspeig
17:00 (UTC+02)	Juanito 35'	Boxscore	Buitre 7'	Stadium: Polideportivo Municipal; Referee: Blas Alonso, Romero Candela
	Penalties
	Juanito (penalty scored); Cristian (penalty scored); Fabricio (penalty scored); Juandi (penalty missed)		(penalty scored) Lucas; (penalty scored) Buitre; (penalty scored) Chus; (penalty scored) Juanfran

Naturpellet Segovia won series 2–1 and advanced to Final.

=== Final ===
==== 1st leg ====
May 15, 2016	Gran Canaria	7–1	Naturpellet Segovia	Las Palmas de Gran Canaria
13:00 (UTC+02)	Ayose 6'; Pablo Salado 12', 35'; Juanillo 22'; Anás 30'; Gus 36'; Pepe 38'	Boxscore	Alvarito 36'	Stadium: Centro Insular de Deportes; Attendance: 1,000; Referee: Centeno Bono, Centeno Bono

==== 2nd leg ====
May 21, 2016	Naturpellet Segovia	3–4 (a.e.t.)	Gran Canaria	Segovia
18:00 (UTC+02)	Alvarito 2'; Lucas 17'; Buitre 30'	Boxscore	Ayose 5'; Saúl 20'; Juanillo 37', 41'	Stadium: Pedro Delgado; Referee: Cotes García, Elena Pedrós

Promoted to Primera División 2016–17
Gran Canaria
(Two years after)

== Top scorers ==
Rank	Player	Club	Goals
1	(Brazil) Fabricio	Hercules San Vicente	38
2	(Spain) Joan	Valdepeñas	35
3	(Spain) Jacobo	Cofersa O'Parrulo	29
4	(Spain) Buitre	Naturpellet Segovia	24
4	(Spain) Fernando	ElPozo Ciudad de Murcia	24
6	(Spain) Esteban	FC Barcelona Lassa B	22
6	(Spain) Juanillo	Gran Canaria	22
8	(Spain) Elián	Plasticos Romero Cartagena	20
8	(Spain) Saura	ElPozo Ciudad de Murcia	20
8	(Spain) Zamo	Valdepeñas	20

== See also ==
- 2015–16 Primera División de Futsal
- 2015–16 Copa del Rey de Futsal
- Segunda División B de Futsal
