= Jerez FS =

Spanish futsal club

Caja San Fernando Jerez
- Full name: Jerez Fútbol Sala
- Founded: 1978
- Dissolved: 2002
- Ground: José Mª Ruíz Mateos, Jerez de la Frontera, Andalusia, Spain
- Capacity: 1,220
- 2001–02: División de Plata, 14th
Home colours	Away colours

Jerez Fútbol Sala was a futsal club based in Jerez de la Frontera, city in the autonomous community of Andalusia. Caja San Fernando Jerez was during several years the most important futsal club from Andalusia.

The club had the sponsorships of Bodegas Garvey and Caja San Fernando.

== History ==
Jerez FS was founded in 1978 and its stadium was Pabellón José Mª Ruíz Mateos with capacity of 1,220 seats. The team played ten consecutive seasons in the División de Honor. For its two last seasons, 2000–01 and 2001–02, the team was forced to play in a nearby city, San Fernando, due to the home ground's not meeting the parquet approval.

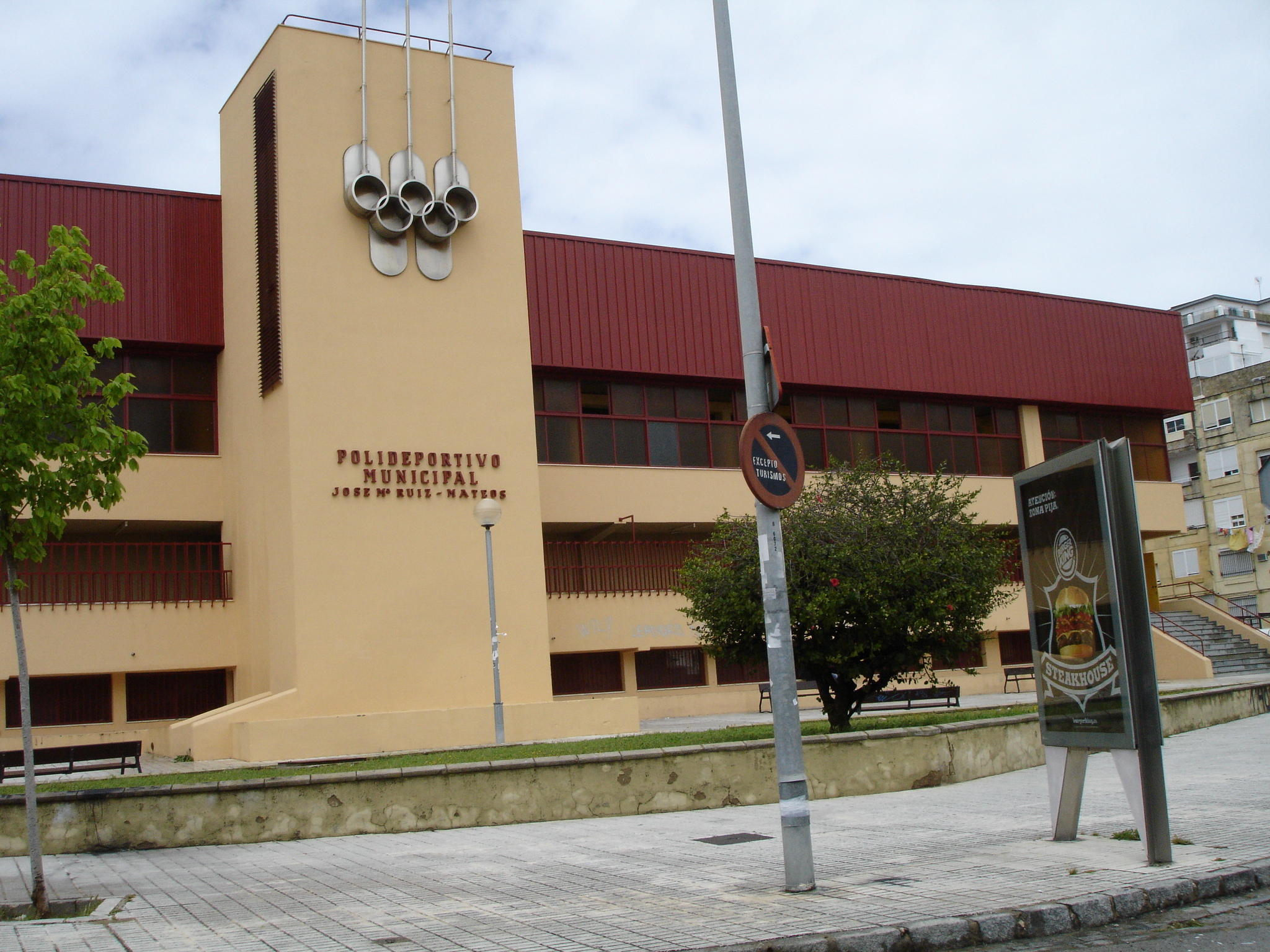
Home stadium

== Honours ==
- División de Honor: 0
  - Quarterfinals: 1997–98

== Season to season ==
Season	Division	Place	Copa de España
1989/90	D. Honor	6th	
1990/91	1ª Nacional A	1st	
1991/92	D. Honor	10th	
1992/93	D. Honor	7th	
1993/94	D. Honor	8th	
1994/95	D. Honor	7th	
1995/96	D. Honor	13th	

Season	Division	Place	Copa de España
1996/97	D. Honor	10th	
1997/98	D. Honor	6th	
1998/99	D. Honor	12th	
1999/00	D. Honor	15th	
2000/01	D. Honor	17th	
2001/02	D. Plata	14th	

- 11 seasons in División de Honor
- 2 seasons in División de Plata
