= 2014–15 Segunda División de Futsal =

Segunda División
- Season: 2014–15
- Relegated: Lymsa Sierra Salinas Villena
- Matches played: 182
- Goals scored: 1,235 (6.79 per match)
- Top goalscorer: Pitu, (Elche CFS), 33
- Biggest home win: Melilla 8–0 Lymsa Sierra Salinas Villena
- Biggest away win: Lymsa Sierra Salinas Villena 1–10 Gran Canaria Colegios Arenas
- Highest scoring: UMA Antequera 8–5 ElPozo Ciudad de Murcia

The 2014–15 Segunda División de Futsal season is the 22nd season of second-tier futsal in Spain since its inception in 1993.

The season comprises regular season and promotion playoff. Regular season begun on September 20, 2014, and finished on April 18, 2015. After finishing regular season, top four teams play promotion playoff to Primera División while the bottom team is relegated Segunda División B.

Promotion playoff will begin on April 25, playing semifinals and Final to the best of 3 matches. Winner of promotion playoff will be promoted to Primera División 2015–16.

== Teams ==
Location of Segunda División teams 2014–15
Canary Islands

Team	Location	Stadium	Capacity
G.C. Colegios Arenas	Las Palmas de Gran Canaria	Centro Insular	5,000
Elche	Elche, Valencian Community	Esperanza Lag	2,000
FC Barcelona B	Barcelona	Pavelló Poliesportiu	472
Plásticos Romero	Cartagena, Region of Murcia	Wsell de Guimbarda	2,500
ElPozo Ciudad de Murcia	Murcia	Palacio de Deportes	7,500
Brihuega	Brihuega, Castile-La Mancha	Virgen de la Peña	500
Melilla	Melilla	Javier Imbroda	3,800
Segovia Futsal	Segovia, Castile and León	Pedro Delgado	2,800
UMA Antequera	Antequera, Andalusia	Fernando Argüelles	2,575
Hércules San Vicente	San Vicente del Raspeig, Alicante	Polideportivo Municipal	700
O'Parrulo	Ferrol, Galicia	A Malata	5,000
Valdepeñas	Valdepeñas, Castile-La Mancha	Virgen de la Cabeza	1,100
Zamora	Zamora	Ángel Nieto	2,200
Lymsa Sierra Salinas Villena	Villena, Alicante	Polideportivo Municipal	500

== Regular season standings ==
Pos	Team	Pld	W	D	L	GF	GA	GD	Pts	Qualification or relegation
1	UMA Antequera	26	16	6	4	135	84	+51	54	Promoted
2	Elche	26	16	5	5	101	67	+34	53	Qualification to the promotion playoffs
3	FC Barcelona B	26	17	1	8	112	68	+44	52	
4	Brihuega	26	15	5	6	96	72	+24	50	Qualification to the promotion playoffs
5	Valdepeñas	26	14	3	9	93	75	+18	45	Qualification to the promotion playoffs
6	Segovia	26	12	5	9	92	85	+7	41	Qualification to the promotion playoffs
7	G.C. Colegios Arenas	26	11	6	9	95	91	+4	39	
8	Melilla	26	12	3	11	88	75	+13	39	
9	Plásticos Romero	26	12	3	11	100	81	+19	39	
10	ElPozo Ciudad de Murcia	26	11	4	11	102	93	+9	37	
11	O'Parrulo	26	7	4	15	74	104	−30	25	
12	Hércules San Vicente	26	5	8	13	65	77	−12	23	
13	Zamora	26	5	5	16	45	92	−47	20	
14	Lymsa Sierra Salinas Villena	26	0	0	26	37	171	−134	0	Relegation to Segunda División B

Updated to match(es) played on 25 April 2015. Source: LNFS – Segunda División and lnfs.es
Rules for classification: 1) points; 2) head-to-head points; 3) head-to-head goal difference; 4) goal difference; 5) number of goals scored

== Promotion playoffs ==
=== Calendar ===
Round	Date	Fixtures	Clubs	Notes
1st round	25 April, 1 May 2015	4	4 → 2	
Final	9/15 May 2015	3	2 → 1	

=== Bracket ===
1st round
2	Elche	2	3
6	Segovia	1	1
4	Brihuega	3	3
5	Valdepeñas	2	2

Final
2	Elche	2	0
4	Brihuega	6	2

=== 1st round ===
==== 1st match ====
April 25, 2015	Segovia	1–2 (a.e.t.)	Elche	Segovia
18:00 (UTC+02)	Edu 12'	Report	J García 24'; Pitu 41'	Stadium: Pedro Delgado; Attendance: 1,300; Referee: Álvarez Rueda, Hevia Campa

April 25, 2015	Valdepeñas	2–3	Brihuega	Valdepeñas
19:00 (UTC+02)	Joan 12'; Miguelito 33'	Report	Blecua 6'; Zamo 9'; Kiki 23'	Stadium: Virgen de la Cabeza; Referee: Cotes García, Elena Pedros

==== 2nd match ====
May 1, 2015	Brihuega	3–2 (a.e.t.)	Valdepeñas	Brihuega
19:00 (UTC+02)	Rubén Marcos 12'; Blecua 43'; Zamo 44'	Report	Francisco 16'; Borrell 44'	Stadium: Virgen de la Peña; Referee: Fernández Caballero, Montero Garrido

May 1, 2015	Elche	3–1	Segovia	Elche
18:00 (UTC+02)	Juanjo 9'; Carri 19'; Kiwi 39'	Report	Álex Fuentes 33'	Stadium: Esperanza Lag; Referee: Carrillo Arroyo, Fernández Domínguez

=== Final ===
==== 1st match ====
May 9, 2015	Brihuega	6–2	Elche	Brihuega
18:00 (UTC+02)	Kiki 3', 6', 25'; Pepe 12', 37'; Rafa Luque 37'	Report	Kiwi 4'; Manu 30'	Stadium: Virgen de la Peña; Referee: González Moreta, Sánchez Chamorro

==== 2nd match ====
May 15, 2015	Elche	0–2	Brihuega	Elche
21:00 (UTC+02)		Report	Blecua 21', 31'	Stadium: Esperanza Lag; Referee: Juan Cerdá, Martínez García

Brihuega won series 2–0 and promoted to Primera División.

Promoted to Primera División 2015–16
~~Brihuega~~
(~~First time ever~~)

== Top scorers ==
Rank	Player	Club	Goals
1	(Spain) Pitu	Elche	33
2	(Spain) Claudio da Silva	UMA Antequera	27
3	(Spain) Juan Emilio	FC Barcelona B	25
4	(Spain) Javi Sánchez	UMA Antequera	23
4	(Spain) Juanillo	G.C. Colegios Arenas	23
4	(Spain) Kike	Valdepeñas	23
7	(Spain) Esteban	FC Barcelona B	22
8	(Spain) Iván	Segovia	21
9	(Spain) Buitre	Segovia	20
9	(Spain) Chillo	UMA Antequera	20

== See also ==
- 2014–15 Primera División de Futsal
- 2014–15 Copa del Rey de Futsal
- Segunda División B de Futsal
