= 1992–93 División de Honor de Futsal =

División de Honor
- Season: 1992–93
- Champions: Pennzoil Marsanz
- Relegated: Las Rozas, Cour Coslada, Decolux León & Isolar Centelles
- European Championship: Pennzoil Marsanz
- Matches played: 288

The 1992–93 season of the División de Honor de Futsal was the 4th season of top-tier futsal in Spain. It was played in two rounds. At first round teams were divided in three groups of 8 teams every one, advancing four first to second round for title. Four last advanced to second round for permanence.

== Regular season ==
=== 1st round ===
==== Group A ====
Second round
Permanence round

P	Team	Pld	W	D	L	GF	GA	Pts
1	Caja Castilla La Mancha	14	9	2	3	77	72	20
2	Univ. de Salamanca	14	7	4	3	62	53	18
3	Mitsubishi Ceuta	14	7	4	3	51	52	18
4	Bisontes de Almazora	14	7	4	3	59	48	18
5	Redislogar Cotransa	14	7	3	4	64	50	17
6	Extremadura	14	4	2	8	51	68	10
7	Mejorada	14	1	6	7	47	57	8
8	Ediciones Lara	14	0	3	11	45	86	3

==== Group B ====
Second round
Permanence round

P	Team	Pld	W	D	L	GF	GA	Pts
1	Industrias García	14	9	3	2	71	38	21
2	Pennzoil Marsanz	14	9	2	3	84	45	20
3	Egasa Coruña	14	8	2	4	41	39	18
4	ElPozo Murcia	14	8	1	5	62	45	17
5	Isolar Centelles	14	6	3	5	50	41	15
6	Gran Canaria	14	5	2	7	49	65	12
7	Las Rozas	14	1	3	10	35	75	5
8	Decolux-León	14	1	2	11	27	71	4

==== Group C ====
Second round
Permanence round

P	Team	Pld	W	D	L	GF	GA	Pts
1	Interviú Boomerang	14	10	2	2	56	32	22
2	Sego Zaragoza	14	9	2	3	56	44	20
3	Caja Segovia	14	5	5	4	57	54	15
4	Muebles El Norte	14	6	2	6	63	63	14
5	CajaSur Jaén	14	6	1	7	63	66	13
6	FC Barcelona	14	6	1	7	39	45	13
7	Garvey Jerez	14	3	3	8	47	56	9
8	Cour Coslada	14	3	0	11	43	64	6

=== 2nd round ===
==== Title – Group Par ====
Playoffs

P	Team	Pld	W	D	L	GF	GA	Pts
1	Caja Castilla La Mancha	10	8	1	1	47	26	17
2	Sego Zaragoza	10	5	4	1	46	23	14
3	Industrias García	10	4	2	4	39	44	10
4	Bisontes de Almazora	10	3	3	4	39	44	9
5	Muebles El Norte	10	2	2	6	33	41	6
6	Egasa Chastón	10	1	2	7	23	49	4

==== Title – Group Impar ====
Playoffs

P	Team	Pld	W	D	L	GF	GA	Pts
1	Pennzoil Marsanz	10	9	0	1	64	31	18
2	Interviú Boomerang	10	7	1	2	42	28	15
3	ElPozo Murcia	10	6	1	3	44	27	13
4	Mitsubishi Ceuta	10	3	0	7	32	54	6
5	Caja Segovia	10	2	1	7	33	55	5
6	Univ. Salamanca	10	1	1	8	37	57	3

==== Permanence – Group Par ====
relegated

P	Team	Pld	W	D	L	GF	GA	Pts
1	Deporsala	10	7	2	1	48	31	16
2	CajaSur Jaén	10	6	0	4	47	33	12
3	Mejorada	10	5	2	3	41	29	12
4	Gran Canaria	10	5	1	4	28	28	11
5	Las Rozas	10	2	1	7	46	53	5
6	Cour Coslada	10	2	0	8	28	64	4

==== Permanence – Group Impar ====
relegated

P	Team	Pld	W	D	L	GF	GA	Pts
1	Ediciones Lara	10	7	1	2	45	39	15
2	Extremadura	10	5	2	3	48	32	12
3	Barcelona	10	5	2	3	39	31	12
4	Garvey Jerez	10	4	3	3	46	33	11
5	Decolux León	10	3	3	4	28	40	9
6	Isolur Centelles	10	0	1	9	22	53	1

== Playoffs ==
semifinals
Caja Castilla-La Mancha	4	7	_
Interviú Boomerang	3	3	_
Pennzoil Marsanz	5	2	3
Sego Zaragoza	2	4	2

final
Caja Castilla-La Mancha	1	4	3
Pennzoil Marsanz	1	4	5

1992–93 División de Honor winners
(Community of Madrid)
Pennzoil Marsanz
First title

== See also ==
- División de Honor de Futsal
- Futsal in Spain
