= FS Zamora =

Spanish futsal club

Zamora
- Full name: Fútbol Sala Zamora
- Nickname(s): --
- Founded: 2001
- Ground: Ángel Nieto, Zamora, Castile and León, Spain
- Capacity: 2,200
- Chairman: (Spain) Justiniano Fernández
- Manager: (Spain) Eloy Alonso
- League: Segunda División
- 2015–16: Segunda Divisió B, 14th, ↓
Home colours	Away colours

Fútbol Sala Zamora is a futsal club based in Zamora, city of the province of Zamora in the autonomous community of Castile and León.

The club was founded in 2001 and her stadium is Pabellón Polideportivo Ángel Nieto with 2,200 seaters.

Club sponsors are Euronics, Fisiolife and Moralejo Selección.

== Season to season ==
Season	Tier	Division	Place	Notes
2001/02	3	1ª Nacional A	3rd	
2002/03	3	1ª Nacional A	2nd	
2003/04	3	1ª Nacional A	7th	
2004/05	3	1ª Nacional A	1st	↑
2005/06	2	D. Plata	10th	
2006/07	2	D. Plata	13th	
2007/08	2	D. Plata	6th	
2008/09	2	D. Plata	1st	↑
2009/10	1	D. Honor	15th	↓
2010/11	2	D. Plata	6th	↓
2011/12	3	2ª División B	9th	
2012/13	3	2ª División B	7th	
2013/14	3	2ª División B	6th	↑
2014/15	2	2ª División	13th	
2015/16	2	2ª División	14th	↓
2016/17	3	2ª División B		

- 1 season in Primera División
- 7 seasons in Segunda División
- 7 seasons in Segunda División B
