= Gran Canaria FS =

Spanish futsal club

Gran Canaria
- Full name: Gran Canaria Fútbol Sala
- Nickname(s): --
- Founded: 1986
- Ground: Centro Insular, Las Palmas; Spain
- Capacity: 5,200
- Chairman: (Spain) Mª del Carmen Rivero
- Manager: (Spain) Suso Méndez
- League: Primera División
- 2015–16: Segunda División, 7th, ↑
Home colours	Away colours

Gran Canaria Fútbol Sala is a futsal club based in Gáldar, they play home games in Las Palmas's provincial capital due to limited seating on Gáldar municipal arena.

The club was founded in 1986 and relocated to Las Palmas in June 2013.

== Club name's ==
- Gáldar FS - (1982–2014)
- Gran Canaria FS - (2014– )

Old logo

== Sponsors ==
- Cohesan - (1991–1993)
- Tecnasa - (1993–1994)
- Comurca - (1995–1999)
- Colegios Arenas - (2001–2009)
- Colegios Arenas (an international bilingual school) - (2012–)

== Season to season ==
Season	Tier	Division	Place	Notes
1990/91	3	1ª Nacional B	—	
1991/92	2	1ª Nacional A	6th	
1992/93	2	1ª Nacional A	1st	↑
1993/94	1	D. Honor	9th	↓
1994/95	2	D. Plata	4th	
1995/96	2	D. Plata	1st	
1996/97	2	D. Plata	7th	
1997/98	2	D. Plata	2nd	
1998/99	2	D. Plata	3rd	
1999/00	2	D. Plata	2nd	
2000/01	2	D. Plata	2nd	
2001/02	2	D. Plata	6th	
2002/03	2	D. Plata	5th	
2003/04	2	D. Plata	2nd	

Season	Tier	Division	Place	Notes
2004/05	2	D. Plata	2nd	
2005/06	2	D. Plata	1st	
2006/07	2	D. Plata	5th	
2007/08	2	D. Plata	5th	
2008/09	2	D. Plata	10th	
2009/10	2	D. Plata	5th	
2010/11	2	D. Plata	4th	
2011/12	2	2ª División	5th	↑
2012/13	1	1ª División	13th	
2013/14	1	1ª División	15th	↓
2014/15	2	2ª División	7th	
2015/16	2	2ª División	7th	↑
2016/17	1	1ª División		

- 4 seasons in Primera División
- 19 seasons in Segunda División
- 2 seasons in Segunda División B
- 1 seasons in Tercera División

== Current squad ==
As of 15 June 2019

#	Position	Name	Nationality
1	Goalkeeper	Alberto Barranquero	(Spain)
3	Defender	Saúl Marrupe	(Spain)
4	Defender	Saúl Jiménez	(Spain)
5	Winger	Jordán Cabrera	(Spain)
6	Winger	Abimael Ramírez	(Spain)
7	Winger	Mehdi Boukercha	(Spain)
8	Defender	Álex Velasco	(Spain)
10	Pivot	Juanillo Bolaños	(Spain)
11	Pivot	Dani Aguilera	(Spain)
14	Defender	Julio Delgado	(Spain)
17	Winger	Adri Orellana	(Spain)
18	Winger	Alex Rivero	(Spain)
22	Goalkeeper	Agustín Cañete	(Spain)
33	Winger	Aythami Torrado	(Spain)

== Notable players ==
- (Romania) Iuliu Safar
