= 1991–92 División de Honor de Futsal =

División de Honor
- Season: 1991–92
- Champions: Pennzoil Marsanz
- Relegated: Las Rozas, Cour Coslada, Decolux León & Isolar Centelles
- European Championship: Pennzoil Marsanz
- Matches played: 268

The 1992–93 season of the División de Honor de Futsal was the 3rd season of top-tier futsal in Spain. It was played in two rounds. At first round teams were drawn in two groups of 10/11 teams every one, advancing eight first to second round for title. Two/three last advanced to second round for permanence.

== Regular season ==
=== 1st round ===
==== Group Par ====
Second round
Permanence round

P	Team	Pld	W	D	L	GF	GA	Pts
1	Redislogar Cotransa	18	14	1	3	98	51	29
2	ElPozo Murcia	18	12	2	4	96	59	26
3	Barcelona	18	9	5	4	73	57	23
4	Pennzoil Marsanz	18	9	5	4	96	65	23
5	Almazora	18	9	2	7	88	71	20
6	Sego Zaragoza	18	6	7	5	77	53	19
7	TDM Coslada	18	8	1	9	72	78	17
8	Industrias García	18	5	3	10	68	86	13
9	Aquasierra CajaSur	18	3	1	14	40	99	7
10	La Garriga	18	1	1	16	44	133	3

==== Group Impar ====
Second round
Permanence round

P	Team	Pld	W	D	L	GF	GA	Pts
1	Interviú Boomerang	20	14	5	1	97	46	33
2	Gran Canaria	20	11	5	4	78	55	27
3	Caja Segovia	20	10	3	7	89	78	23
4	Caja Toledo	20	11	0	9	62	65	22
5	Solidian Málaga	20	10	2	8	66	58	22
6	Algón	20	8	5	7	64	55	21
7	Egasa Chaston	20	8	3	9	52	54	19
8	Universidad de Salamanca	20	7	4	9	84	90	18
9	Industriales de Astorga	20	6	5	9	83	103	17
10	Garvey Jerez	20	6	2	12	58	81	14
11	Európolis Las Rozas	20	1	2	17	51	99	4

=== 2nd round ===
==== Title – Group A ====
Playoffs

P	Team	Pld	W	D	L	GF	GA	Pts
1	Pennzoil Marsanz	6	5	1	0	32	17	11
2	Redislogar Cotransa	6	3	1	2	29	26	7
3	Almazora	6	3	0	3	30	33	6
4	Industrias García	6	0	0	6	17	33	0

==== Title – Group B ====
Playoffs

P	Team	Pld	W	D	L	GF	GA	Pts
1	Interviú Boomerang	6	5	0	1	33	11	10
2	Caja Toledo	6	4	0	2	25	15	8
3	Solidian Málaga	6	2	0	4	13	30	4
4	Universidad de Salamanca	6	1	0	5	16	29	2

==== Title – Group C ====
Playoffs

P	Team	Pld	W	D	L	GF	GA	Pts
1	ElPozo Murcia	6	6	0	0	32	17	12
2	Caja Segovia	6	3	1	2	33	26	7
3	Algón	6	1	2	3	13	24	4
4	TDM Coslada	6	0	1	5	21	32	1

==== Title – Group D ====
Playoffs

P	Team	Pld	W	D	L	GF	GA	Pts
1	Sego Zaragoza	6	5	0	1	23	15	10
2	Egasa Chastón	6	3	0	3	18	14	6
3	Barcelona	6	2	0	4	11	20	4
4	Gran Canaria	6	2	0	4	22	25	4

==== Relegation group ====
relegated

P	Team	Pld	W	D	L	GF	GA	Pts
1	Garvey Jerez	8	4	2	2	34	34	10
2	Industriales Astorga	8	4	1	3	46	37	9
3	Európolis Las Rozas	8	3	3	2	27	25	9
4	CajaSur Aquasierra	8	2	3	3	27	30	7
5	La Garriga	8	2	1	5	30	38	5

== Playoffs ==
quarter-finals
Redislogar Cotransa	3	2
Interviú Boomerang	4	3
Egasa Chastón	4	2	_
ElPozo Murcia	4	4	_
Caja Segovia	1	1	_
Sego Zaragoza	9	5	_
Caja Toledo	7	4	_
Pennzoil Marsanz	5	3	_

semifinals
Interviú Boomerang	3	2	5
ElPozo Murcia	1	5	7
Sego Zaragoza	3	3
Caja Toledo	4	3

final
ElPozo Murcia	2	3	_
Caja Toledo	5	5	_

1991–92 División de Honor winners
(Castilla–La Mancha)
Caja Toledo
First title

== See also ==
- División de Honor de Futsal
- Futsal in Spain
