= Segovia Futsal =

Spanish futsal club

Naturpellet Segovia
- Full name: Club Deportivo Segovia Futsal
- Founded: January 15, 2013
- Ground: Pedro Delgado, Segovia, Castile and León, Spain
- Capacity: 2,800
- Chairman: (Spain) Rafael Encinas
- Manager: (Spain) Diego Gacimartín
- League: Segunda División
- 2015–16: Segunda División, 6th
| Home colours | Away colours |

Club Deportivo Segovia Futsal, is a futsal club based in Segovia, city of the Province of Segovia in the autonomous community of Castile and León.

The club was founded in 2013 and its playing venue is Pedro Delgado with capacity of 2,800 seaters.

== History ==
Segovia Futsal was founded in 2013 after the demise of historical club Caja Segovia. It started playing in Segunda División after being invited by the Royal Spanish Football Federation.

Four years later, the club achieves the promotion to Primera División.

== Season to season ==
| Season | Tier | Division | Place | Notes |
|---|---|---|---|---|
| 2013/14 | 2 | 2ª División | 10th | |
| 2014/15 | 2 | 2ª División | 6th | |
| 2015/16 | 2 | 2ª División | 6th | |
| 2016/17 | 2 | 2ª División | 2nd | Promoted |

- 4 seasons in Segunda División

== Current squad ==
As of 25 May 2019

| # | Position | Name | Nationality |
|---|---|---|---|
| 2 | Goalkeeper | Thiago Soares | (Brazil) |
| 5 | Defender | Edu Cubero | (Spain) |
| 6 | Defender | José Raya | (Spain) |
| 7 | Winger | Álvaro López | (Spain) |
| 8 | Winger | Chus Blázquez | (Spain) |
| 9 | Pivot | Antonio Diz | (Spain) |
| 10 | Winger | Álex Fuentes | (Spain) |
| 12 | Winger | Julio Miguel Delgado | (Spain) |
| 14 | Winger | Iago Rodríguez | (Spain) |
| 15 | Goalkeeper | Alberto Sanz | (Spain) |
| 17 | Pivot | Buitre | (Spain) |
| 31 | Winger | Munir Louah | (Spain) |
