= Jaén FS =

Spanish futsal club

Jaén Paraíso Interior
- Full name: Jaén Fútbol Sala
- Founded: 1980
- Ground: Olivo Arena, Jaén, Spain
- Capacity: 6,500
- Chairman: (Spain) Nicolás Sabariego
- Manager: (Spain) Dani Rodríguez
- League: Primera División
- 2022–23: Regular season: 4th of 16; Playoffs: Runners-up
- Website: https://www.jaenfs.com/
Home colours	Away colours

Jaén Fútbol Sala is a futsal club based in Jaén, city of the autonomous community of Andalusia.

The club was established in 1980 and its pavilion is the Olivo Arena with capacity of 6,500 seats since 2021.

== History ==
In May 2013, Fuconsa Jaén achieved its third promotion to Primera División in its history. Its last promotion to Primera División occurred in 1999.

In March 2015, Jaén Paraíso Interior, won its first national title after defeating FC Barcelona in the final of the Copa de España, played in Ciudad Real, by 6–4.

== Sponsors ==
- CajaSur - (1992–1993)
- Cánava - (1993–1994)
- Alvic - (1995–1997)
- Paraíso Interior - (1997–2000)
- Real Jaén - (2000–2003)
- Paraíso Interior - (2006–2010)
- Fuconsa - (2010–2013)
- Paraíso Interior - (2013–)

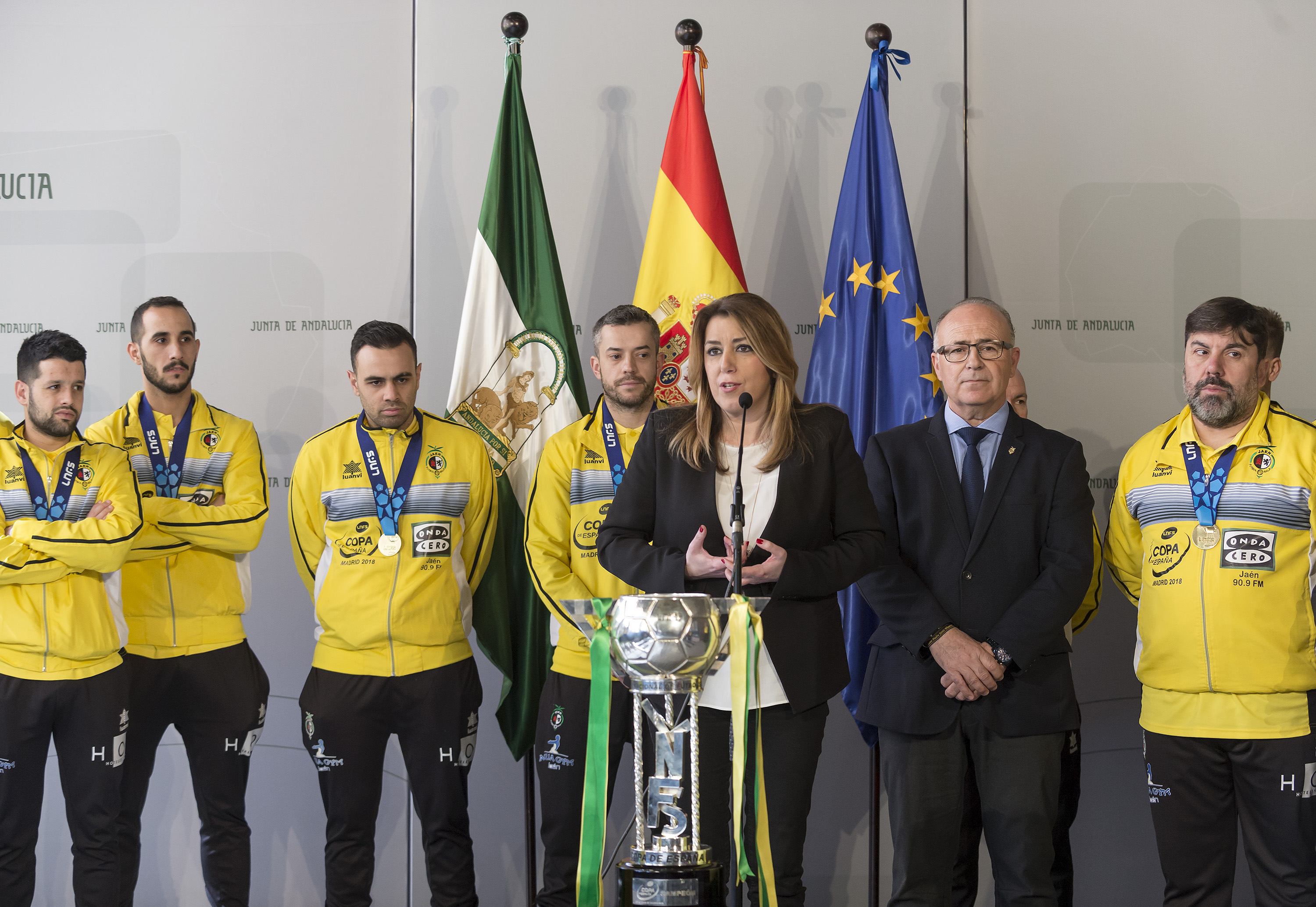

== Current squad ==
As of 25 November 2024

Note: Flags indicate national team as defined under FIFA eligibility rules; some limited exceptions apply. Players may hold more than one non-FIFA nationality.

No.	Pos.	Nation	Player
1	Goalkeeper	BRA	Carlos Espíndola
5	Defender	BRA	João Salla
6	Winger	ESP	Dani Zurdo
8	Defender	VEN	Carlos Sanz
9	Pivot	ESP	Cristian Rubio
12	Winger	ESP	Renato Lopes
14	Pivot	ARG	Alan Brandi (captain)
15	Winger	ESP	Alejandro Lemine
20	Winger	ESP	Chino
21	Winger	ESP	Míchel Moya
23	Winger	BRA	Franklin
28	Goalkeeper	BRA	Dudú
41	Pivot	ARG	Matías Rosa
55	Winger	BRA	Giancarlos Antoniazzi

== Season to season ==
Season	Tier	Division	Place	Notes
1991/92	3	1ª Nacional B	—	↑
1992/93	1	D. Honor	5th	
1993/94	1	D. Honor	9th	↓
1994/95	2	D. Plata	3rd	
1995/96	2	D. Plata	2nd	
1996/97	2	D. Plata	1st	↑
1997/98	1	D. Honor	14th	
1998/99	1	D. Honor	17th	↓
1999/00	2	D. Plata	2nd	
2000/01	2	D. Plata	3rd	
2001/02	2	D. Plata	5th	
2002/03	2	D. Plata	15th	↓
2003/04	3	1ª Nacional A	—	

Season	Tier	Division	Place	Notes
2004/05	3	1ª Nacional A	—	
2005/06	3	1ª Nacional A	—	
2006/07	3	1ª Nacional A	3rd	
2007/08	3	1ª Nacional A	11th	
2008/09	3	1ª Nacional A	5th	
2009/10	3	1ª Nacional A	1st	↑
2010/11	2	D. Plata	14th	
2011/12	2	2ª División	4th	
2012/13	2	2ª División	5th	↑
2013/14	1	1ª División	10th	
2014/15	1	1ª División	4th / QF	
2015/16	1	1ª División	12th	Winners
2016/17	1	1ª División		

- 8 seasons in Primera División
- 10 seasons in Segunda División
- 7 seasons in Segunda División B
- 1 seasons in Tercera División

== Honours ==
- Copa de España: 4
  - 2015, 2018, 2023, 2026
