= Quijote Arena =

Arena in Ciudad Real, Spain

Coordinates: 38.97485°N 3.937515°W

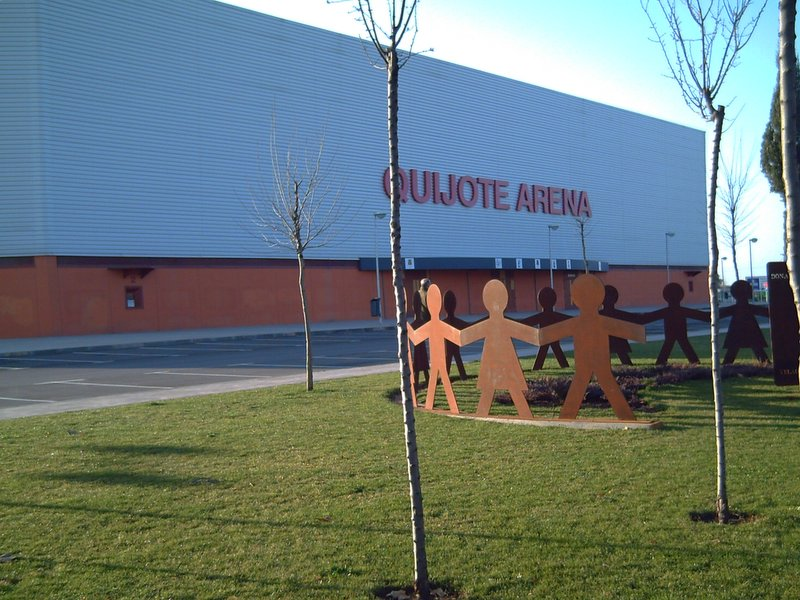
- Interactive map of Quijote Arena
- Location: Ciudad Real, Castilla-La Mancha, Spain
- Owner: City of Ciudad Real
- Capacity: 6,863
- Field size: 46 x 26

Construction
- Opened: December 28, 2003

Tenants
- BM Ciudad Real (2003–2011); BM Alarcos Ciudad Real (2014–present); Club Balonmano Caserío Ciudad Real

Quijote Arena is an arena in Ciudad Real, Spain. It is primarily used for team handball and was the home arena of BM Ciudad Real. The arena holds 6,863 people and was opened in 2004.

It is located on the Avenida de Puertollano, and is owned by the municipality of Ciudad Real.

In September 2014, BM Alarcos Ciudad Real confirmed they would start to play their home games at Quijote Arena.
