= Diego Blanco =

Bolivian footballer (born 1988)

Personal information
- Full name: Diego Marcelo Blanco Vallejos
- Date of birth: 1 March 1988 (age 38)
- Place of birth: Cochabamba, Bolivia
- Height: 1.78 m (5 ft 10 in)
- Position: Defender

Senior career*
Years	Team	Apps	(Gls)
2008–2010	Aurora		
2011	La Paz		
2011–2014	Aurora		
2014–2015	Real Potosí		
2015–2016	Ciclón		
- * Club domestic league appearances and goals

Diego Marcelo Blanco Vallejos (born 1 March 1988) is a retired Bolivian football defender. (Note: Diego Blanco at WorldFootball.net)
