= ElPozo =

Spanish Company

ElPozo Alimentación S.A.
- Type: Sociedad Anónima
- Industry: Food processing
- Founded: 1954
- Headquarters: Alhama de Murcia, Spain
- Area served: Worldwide
- Key people: Tomás Fuertes (President)
- Products: Meat products, deli meats, processed foods
- Parent: Grupo Fuertes

ElPozo Alimentación S.A. is a Spanish company in the food industry, located in the Región de Murcia, with its registered office in Alhama de Murcia (España); it is part of the business group Grupo Fuertes.

== History ==
The company was founded in 1954, and has its roots in a delicatessen opened in Alhama de Murcia in 1936.

In 2011, its president, Tomás Fuertes, received the Gold Medal for Merit at Work, the highest distinction awarded by the Spanish State, in recognition of his important role in the development and modernization of the Spanish food sector.

== Recent history ==
The president of the company, Tomás Fuertes, received the Gold Medal of Merit in Labour, a high decoration conceded by the Spanish State, in 2011, in recognition of his important role in the development and modernization of the Spanish food sector.

It is the second-biggest company in terms of turnover in the autonomous community of Murcia with 1129 million euros, an 8.4 per cent increase in relation to the previous year, (financial year 2017). This is only exceeded by the company Hefame. In 2018 there are over, 4600 direct workers and 23,000 jobs created indirectly. The company is present in 75 countries around the world and exports to four continents. Similarly, in 2018, for the third consecutive year, ElPozo is the most purchased brand by Spanish households, according to the Brand Footprint 2018 report from the consultancy firm Kantar Worldpanel. It is ranked number 20 in the Spanish food sector and number one in the provinces of Andalucia, Castilla–La Mancha, The Canary Islands, Murcia, and Extremadura.

The firm leads the health segment of the market, including products in its "ultra-healthy", low fat and low sodium varieties.

== Involvement with sports ==
In 2018 ElPozo was awarded the European Sport and Healthy Company 2018, making it the first Spanish company to receive this award. ElPozo has 5000m2 of sporting space for use by its staff which including a gymnasium, tennis courts, and other sports facilities.

ElPozo is the sponsor of the Indoor football team ElPozo Murcia Turística.
