= FC Andorra Futsal =

Spanish futsal club

FC Andorra
- Full name: Futbol Club Andorra Futsal
- Founded: 1986
- Dissolved: 2013
- Ground: Poliesportiu d'Andorra; Andorra la Vella Andorra
- Capacity: 4,000
- 2012–13: Segunda División, 6th
Home colours	Away colours

Futbol Club Andorra Futsal, was a futsal team based in Andorra la Vella (Andorra), sports section of FC Andorra, established in 1986 and played in the Spanish futsal league system.

In July 2013, FC Andorra's chairman, François Moliné announced the shutdown of futsal section due to financial mismanagement and lack of private financial support.

== Sponsors ==
- 2002–08: Butagaz
- 2008–11: BP
- 2011–12: Hotels Plaza

== Season to season ==
Season	Tier	Division	Place	Copa de España
1994/95	3	1ª Nacional A	1st	
1995/96	2	D. Plata	10th	
1996/97	2	D. Plata	6th	
1997/98	2	D. Plata	7th	
1998/99	2	D. Plata	9th	
1999/00	2	D. Plata	8th	
2000/01	2	D. Plata	1st	
2001/02	1	D. Honor	16th	
2002/03	2	D. Plata	8th	
2003/04	2	D. Plata	4th	

Season	Tier	Division	Place	Copa de España
2004/05	2	D. Plata	5th	
2005/06	2	D. Plata	9th	
2006/07	2	D. Plata	16th	
2007/08	3	1ª Nacional A	1st	
2008/09	2	D. Plata	6th	
2009/10	2	D. Plata	4th	
2010/11	2	D. Plata	7th	
2011/12	2	2ª División	11th	
2012/13	2	2ª División	6th	

- 1 seasons in Primera División
- 16 seasons in Segunda División
- 2 seasons in Segunda División B

== Current squad 2012/13 ==
No.	Player	Full name	Pos.	Nat.
1	Felipe	Felipe Mariano Napoli	Goalkeeper	(Brazil)
15	Aitor	Aitor Rubio Fernández	Goalkeeper	(Andorra)
8	Iván	Iván López del Pino	Cierre	(Spain)
10	Carlinhos	Carlos Lima Becerra	Cierre	(Brazil)
4	Cristo	Cristo Albino Palacios	Ala	(Spain)
9	Castilla	Abel Martínez Yuste	Ala	(Spain)
11	Xuxa	Rubén Reigosa Rodríguez	Ala	(Spain)
13	Allan	Allan Nepomuceno	Ala	(Andorra)
3	Jorge	Jorge García Palacios	Pivot	(Spain)
7	Ique	Carlos Henrique Ribeiro	Pivot	(Brazil)
12	Antoñito	Antonio Ortega Medina	Pivot	(Spain)
14	Hicham	Hicham Cheham	Pivot	(Morocco)

== Notable former players ==
- (Spain) Miguelín
