= Puertollano FS =

Spanish futsal club

Puertollano
- Full name: Puertollano Fútbol Sala
- Nickname(s): --
- Founded: 1994
- Dissolved: 2013
- Ground: Antonio Rivilla, Puertollano; Spain
- Capacity: 3,000
- Chairman: (Spain) Borja Tomás
- 2012–13: Primera División, 14th – relegated
Home colours	Away colours

Puertollano Fútbol Sala was a futsal club based in Puertollano, city of the autonomous community of Castile-La Mancha.

The club was founded in 1994 and played home games at Antonio Rivilla with capacity of 3,000 seaters.

In 2012–13 season, played in Primera División finishing in bottom place, being relegated to Segunda División. After unclear weeks about the club future, was disbanded due to unpaid debts and limited financial means.

== Sponsors ==
- Viproman - (1996–1999)
- Restaurante Dacho - (2008–2010)

== Season to season ==
Season	Tier	Division	Place	Copa de España
1994/95	4	1ª Nacional B	—	
1995/96	3	1ª Nacional A	1st	
1996/97	2	D. Plata	7th	
1997/98	2	D. Plata	10th	
1998/99	2	D. Plata	7th	
1999/00	2	D. Plata	16th	
2000/01	3	1ª Nacional A	—	
2001/02	3	1ª Nacional A	—	
2002/03	4	1ª Nacional B	—	
2003/04	4	1ª Nacional B	—	

Season	Tier	Division	Place	Copa de España
2004/05	3	1ª Nacional A	—	
2005/06	3	1ª Nacional A	—	
2006/07	3	1ª Nacional A	8th	
2007/08	3	1ª Nacional A	1st	
2008/09	2	D. Plata	9th	
2009/10	2	D. Plata	2nd	
2010/11	2	D. Plata	1st	
2011/12	1	1ª División	9th	
2012/13	1	1ª División	14th	

- 2 seasons in Primera División
- 7 seasons in Segunda División
- 7 seasons in Segunda División B
- 3 seasons in Tercera División

== Current squad 2012/13 ==
No.	Player	Full name	Pos.	Nat.
13	Borja	Borja Tomás Sánchez	Goalkeeper	(Spain)
15	Mañas	Carlos Mañas	Goalkeeper	(Spain)
19	Frois	Rubén Frois Alende	Goalkeeper	(Spain)
6	Contreras	José Contreras Garcés	Cierre	(Spain)
5	Robert	Roberto Subirón García	Ala	(Spain)
7	Medhi	Medhi Daniel Boukercha	Ala	(Spain)
8	Alvarito	Álvaro Sanz Crespo	Ala	(Spain)
10	Nano	David Duque González	Ala	(Spain)
17	Villoria	José Luis Villoria	Ala	(Spain)
11	Chicho	Francisco Jesús Jiménez	Ala	(Spain)
18	Akira	Akira Minamoto	Ala	(Japan)
5	Merino	Alberto Merino Cuervo	Pivot	(Spain)
9	Dani Colorado	Daniel Colorado García	Pivot	(Spain)
11	Chino	Javier García Moreno	Pivot	(Spain)
