= 2010–11 División de Plata de Futsal =

División de Plata
- Season: 2010–11
- Promoted: Via-playoffs
- Relegated: see standings
- Top goalscorer: Jordi Lledó (UPV Maristas Valencia), 45 goals
- Biggest home win: BP Andorra 11–1 Melilla
- Biggest away win: Extremadura Cáceres 2016 1–7 Lanzarote Tias Yaiza
- Highest scoring: Lanzarote Tias Yaiza 9–9 Gáldar Gran Canaria

The 2010–11 season of the División de Plata was the 18th season of second-tier futsal in Spain.

== Regular season ==
=== Standings ===
Position	Club	Played	Wins	Draws	Losses	Goals for	Goals against	Points
1	Puertollano	36	28	6	2	125	58	90
2	Ríos Renovables Ribera Navarra	36	25	6	5	158	88	81
3	UPV Maristas Valencia	36	20	5	11	144	111	65
4	Gáldar Gran Canaria	36	18	8	10	130	115	62
5	Burela	36	16	12	8	108	82	60
6	Arcebansa Zamora	36	18	6	12	111	99	60
7	BP Andorra	36	17	8	11	141	116	59
8	Lanzarote Tias Yaiza	36	15	7	14	152	143	52
9	Barcelona B Alusport	36	15	6	15	103	102	51
10	UMA Antequera	36	13	11	12	139	141	50
11	ElPozo Ciudad de Murcia	36	15	5	16	129	125	50
12	Unión África Ceutí	36	12	10	14	101	107	46
13	Azulejos y Pavimentos Brihuega	36	12	10	14	112	115	46
14	Fuconsa Jaén	36	11	7	18	88	102	40
15	Space Gasifred Ciutat d'Eivissa	36	10	7	19	119	134	37
16	Melilla	36	9	5	22	92	144	32
17	Extremadura Cáceres 2016	36	7	10	19	104	150	31
18	Albacete 2010	36	6	8	22	99	143	26
19	Restaurante Frontera Tobarra	36	5	3	28	74	154	15

Azulejos y Pavimentos Brihuega, Lanzarote Tias Yaiza & Arcebansa Zamora renounced for the next season (2011–12).

direct promotion	promotion playoffs	relegated

== Promotion playoffs ==
quarter-finals
Arcebansa Zamora	3	0	2
UPV Maristas Valencia	2	2	7
BP Andorra	3	3	_
Ríos Renovables R.N.	5	5	_
CD Burela	4	2	1
Gáldar Gran Canaria	0	4	5
Lanzarote Tias Yaiza	1	1	_
Marfil Santa Coloma	4	8	_

semifinals
UPV Maristas Valencia	2	2	_
Ríos Renovables R.N.	6	3	_
Gáldar Gran Canaria	3	2	_
Marfil Santa Coloma	5	3	_

final
P	Ríos Renovables R.N.
R	Marfil Santa Coloma

=== 1st round ===
==== 1st leg ====
May 14, 2011	Lanzarote Tias Yaiza	1–4	Marfil Santa Coloma	Arrecife
16:00 (CEST)		Report		Stadium: Ciudad Deportiva de Lanzarote; Referee: Gracia Marín, Munez Carpintero

May 14, 2011	BP Andorra	3–5	Ríos Renovables Ribera Navarra	Andorra la Vella
18:30 (CEST)		Report		Stadium: Pavelló Poliesportiu; Referee: Pons Rodríguez, Sarrat Nuevo

May 14, 2011	Arcebanza Zamora	3–2	UPV Maristas Valencia	Zamora
19:00 (CEST)		Report		Stadium: Pabellón Ángel Nieto; Referee: Fernández Muñiz, Hevia Campa

May 14, 2011	Burela	4–0	Gáldar Gran Canaria	Burela
19:00 (CEST)		Report		Stadium: Pabellón Vista Alegre; Referee: González Moreta, Sánchez Chamorro

==== 2nd leg ====
May 20, 2011	Marfil Santa Coloma	8–1	Lanzarote Tias Yaiza	Santa Coloma
20:00 (CEST)		Report		Stadium: Pabelló Jacint Verdaguer; Referee: López García, Sánchez Ayala

May 20, 2011	UPV Maristas Valencia	2–0	Arcebansa Zamora	Valencia
20:30 (CEST)		Report		Stadium: Pabellón Universidad Politécnica; Referee: López García, Sánchez Ayala

May 21, 2011	Gáldar Gran Canaria	4–2	Burela	Las Palmas
17:30 (WEST)		Report		Stadium: Pabellón Juan Beltrán Sierra; Referee: López García, Sánchez Ayala

May 21, 2011	Ríos Renovables Ribera Navarra	5–3	BP Andorra	Tudela
18:30 (CEST)		Report		Stadium: Pabellón Polideportivo Elola; Referee: Bernabéu Haro, Busquets González

==== 3rd leg ====
May 22, 2011	UPV Maristas Valencia	7–2	Arcebansa Zamora	Valencia
12:00 (CEST)		Report		Stadium: Pabellón Universidad Politécnica; Referee: Hidalgo Marín, Marín Márquez

May 22, 2011	Gáldar Gran Canaria	5–1	Burela	Las Palmas
18:30 (WEST)		Report		Stadium: Pabellón Juan Beltrán Sierra; Referee: Moreno Durán, Pérez Pérez

=== Second round ===
==== 1st leg ====
May 28, 2011	UPV Maristas Valencia	2–6	Ríos Renovables Ribera Navarra	Valencia
18:00 (CEST)		Report		Stadium: Pabellón Universidad Politécnica; Referee: Fernández Domínguez & Reyes Valdellos

May 29, 2011	Gáldar Gran Canaria	3–5	Marfil Santa Coloma	Las Palmas
12:00 (WEST)		Report		Stadium: Pabellón Juan Beltrán Sierra; Referee: Gutiérrez Lumbreras, Lope Díaz

==== 2nd leg ====
June 3, 2011	Marfil Santa Coloma	3–2 (a.e.t.)	Gáldar Gran Canaria	Santa Coloma
20:00 (CEST)		Report		Stadium: Pabellón Jacint Verdaguer; Referee: Alonso Montesinos, Rubio Fajardo

June 4, 2011	Ríos Renovables Ribera Navarra	3–2	UPV Maristas Valencia	Tudela
19:00 (CEST)		Report		Stadium: Pabellón Municipal Elola; Referee: Díaz Rodríguez, García Hernández

Promoted to Primera División
Puertollano (First time ever)	Ríos Renovables R.N. (First time ever)

== Top goal scorers ==
Player	Goals	Team
Jordi Lledó	45	UPV Maristas Valencia
Néstor	42	Gáldar Gran Canaria
Fabricio	39	Ríos Renovables Ribera Navarra
Paulinho	35	BP Andorra
Álex	32	UMA Antequera
Minhoca	29	Gáldar Gran Canaria
Carlos Alberto	28	Arcebansa Zamora
Pablo Ángel	28	Extremadura Cáceres 2016
Párraga	28	Puertollano
Silami	28	UPV Maristas Valencia

== See also ==
- 2010–11 División de Honor de Futsal
- 2010–11 Copa del Rey de Futsal
- División de Plata
