= Bebe (futsal player, born 1990) =

Spanish futsal player

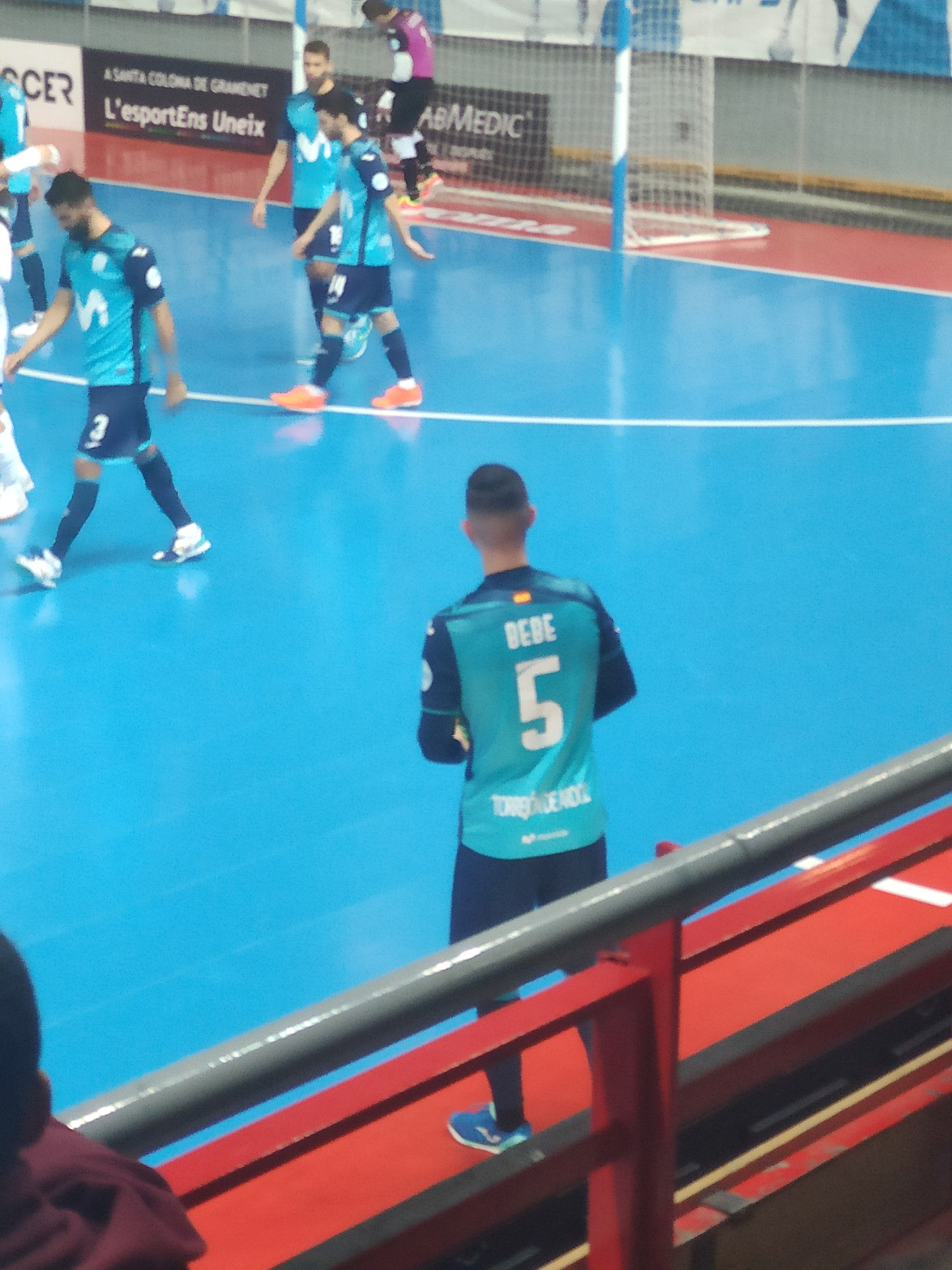

Personal information
- Full name: Rafael García Aguilera
- Date of birth: 28 May 1990 (age 36)
- Place of birth: Córdoba, Spain
- Position: Defender

Team information
- Current team: Inter FS
- Number: 5

Senior career*
Years	Team	Apps	(Gls)
2010–2011	ElPozo Murcia		
2010–2011	Cartagena		
2011–2017	ElPozo Murcia		
2017–2020	Inter Movistar		
2020–	Cartagena		

International career
- Spain
- * Club domestic league appearances and goals

Rafael García Aguilera (born 28 May 1990), commonly known as Bebe, is a Spanish futsal player who plays for Cartagena as a defender.

== Honours ==
- UEFA Futsal Champions League fourth place: 2018–19
