= Lin (futsal player) =

Spanish futsal player

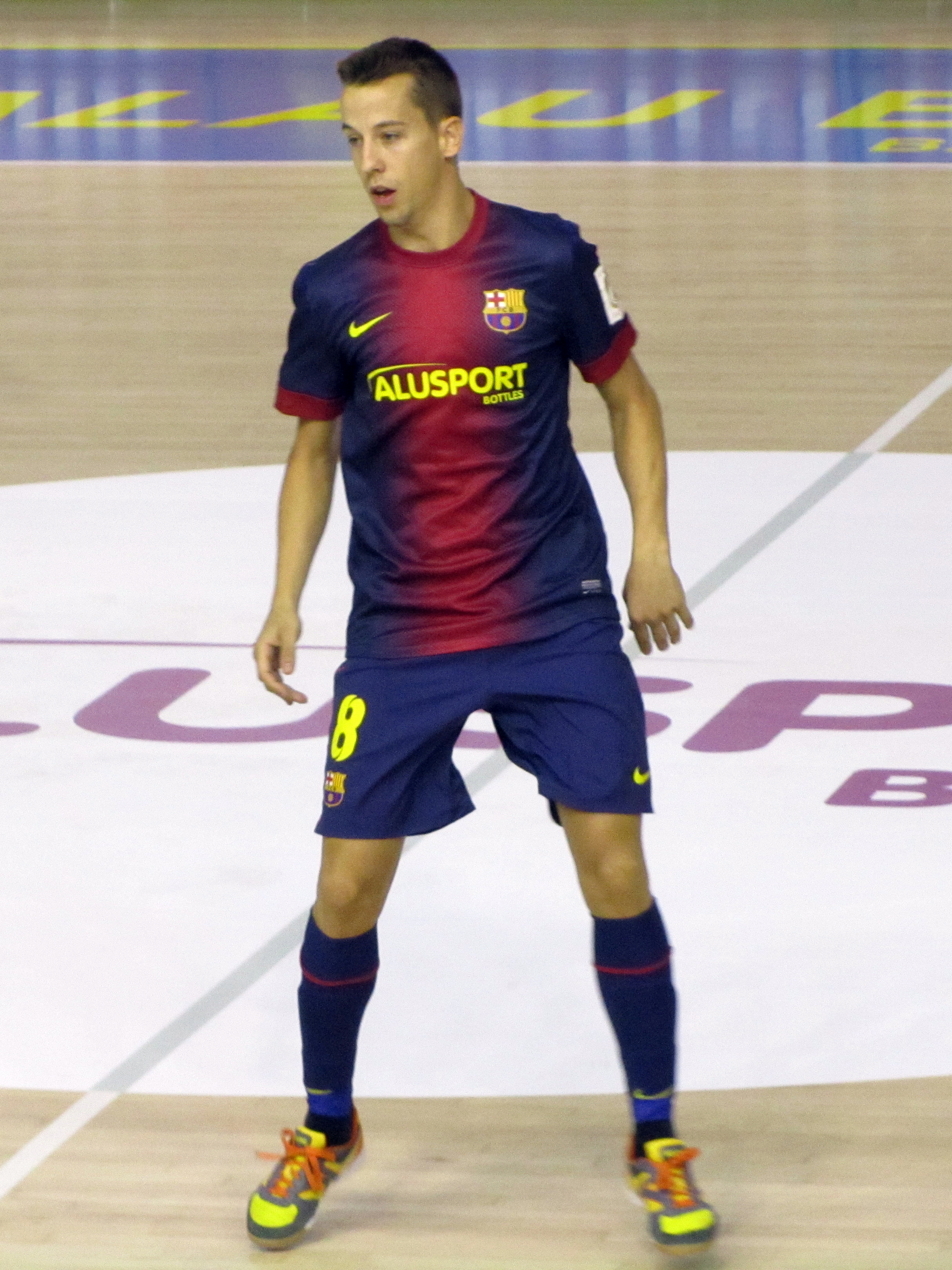

Personal information
- Full name: Ángel Velasco Marugán
- Date of birth: 16 May 1986 (age 40)
- Place of birth: Segovia, Spain
- Height: 1.70 m (5 ft 7 in)
- Position: Forward

Team information
- Current team: KPRF
- Number: 8

Senior career*
Years	Team	Apps	(Gls)
2004–2005	Inter Movistar	7	(0)
2005–2010	Caja Segovia	140	(55)
2010–2016	Barcelona	122	(47)
2016–2021	KPRF	150	(70)
2021–	Real Betis		

International career
	Spain	25	
- * Club domestic league appearances and goals

Ángel Velasco Marugán (born 16 May 1986), commonly known as Lin, is a Spanish futsal player who plays for Real Betis as a winger.

== Honours ==
- 3 Spanish futsal leagues (2004/05, 2010/11, 2011/12)
- 3 Copa de España (2011, 2012, 2013)
- 1 Copa del Rey (2011)
- 2 UEFA Futsal Cup (2012, 2014)
- 1 Copa Intercontinental (2005)
- 3 Futsal Euro (2010, 2012, 2016)
- 1 Campeonato de España de Selecciones Sub-18
- 1 Subcampeonato juvenil de clubes de España (2004/05)
