= Rafael Rato =

Brazilian futsal player

Personal information
- Full name: Rafael França Bezerra
- Date of birth: 16 June 1983 (age 43)
- Place of birth: Recife, Brazil
- Height: 1.77 m (5 ft 9 1/2 in)
- Position: Defender

Team information
- Current team: Valdepeñas
- Number: 41

Senior career*
Years	Team	Apps	(Gls)
2001–2002	Sport Recife		
2002–2003	Ulbra		
2004–2006	Las Rozas		
2006–2007	Cartagena		
2007–2009	Playas de Castellón		
2009–2011	Lobelle Santiago		
2011–2019	Inter Movistar		
2019–	Valdepeñas		

International career
- Brazil
- * Club domestic league appearances and goals

Rafael França Bezerra (born 16 June 1983), commonly known as Rafael or Rafael Rato, is a Brazilian futsal player who plays for Valdepeñas and the Brazil national team.
