= Álex Yepes =

Spanish futsal player

Álex
Personal information
- Full name: Alejandro Yepes Balsalobre
- Date of birth: 12 March 1989 (age 37)
- Place of birth: Cieza, Spain
- Position: Pivot

Team information
- Current team: ElPozo Murcia
- Number: 10

Senior career*
| Years | Team | Apps | (Gls) |
| 2011– | ElPozo Murcia | | |

International career
- Spain
- * Club domestic league appearances and goals

Alejandro Yepes Balsalobre (born 12 March 1989), commonly known as Álex, is a Spanish futsal player who plays for San Giuseppe as a Pivot.
