= Miguelín =

Spanish futsal player

Personal information
- Full name: Miguel Sayago Martí
- Date of birth: 9 May 1985 (age 41)
- Place of birth: Palma de Mallorca, Spain
- Positions: Ala; Pivot

Team information
- Current team: ElPozo Murcia

Senior career*
Years	Team	Apps	(Gls)
2002–2005	Son Rapinya		
2005–2006	Andorra	25	(23)
2006–2007	Inca	17	(23)
2007–2011	Fisiomedia Manacor	120	(117)
2011–2021	ElPozo Murcia	39	(31)
2021-2023	Cordoba		
2023–2024	Pesaro		
2025–	Fortuna Düsseldorf		

International career
- Spain
- * Club domestic league appearances and goals

Miguel Sayago Martí (born 9 May 1985), commonly known as Miguelín, is a Spanish futsal player who plays for ElPozo Murcia as an Ala.
